

179001–179100 

|-bgcolor=#E9E9E9
| 179001 ||  || — || September 7, 2001 || Socorro || LINEAR || — || align=right | 2.6 km || 
|-id=002 bgcolor=#E9E9E9
| 179002 ||  || — || September 7, 2001 || Socorro || LINEAR || — || align=right | 1.9 km || 
|-id=003 bgcolor=#E9E9E9
| 179003 ||  || — || September 7, 2001 || Socorro || LINEAR || XIZ || align=right | 1.9 km || 
|-id=004 bgcolor=#E9E9E9
| 179004 ||  || — || September 7, 2001 || Socorro || LINEAR || — || align=right | 2.5 km || 
|-id=005 bgcolor=#E9E9E9
| 179005 ||  || — || September 7, 2001 || Socorro || LINEAR || — || align=right | 1.1 km || 
|-id=006 bgcolor=#E9E9E9
| 179006 ||  || — || September 7, 2001 || Socorro || LINEAR || EUN || align=right | 1.8 km || 
|-id=007 bgcolor=#E9E9E9
| 179007 ||  || — || September 8, 2001 || Socorro || LINEAR || RAF || align=right | 1.3 km || 
|-id=008 bgcolor=#d6d6d6
| 179008 ||  || — || September 10, 2001 || Socorro || LINEAR || EOS || align=right | 3.0 km || 
|-id=009 bgcolor=#E9E9E9
| 179009 ||  || — || September 11, 2001 || Socorro || LINEAR || AER || align=right | 1.9 km || 
|-id=010 bgcolor=#E9E9E9
| 179010 ||  || — || September 11, 2001 || Socorro || LINEAR || — || align=right | 2.7 km || 
|-id=011 bgcolor=#E9E9E9
| 179011 ||  || — || September 12, 2001 || Socorro || LINEAR || HNS || align=right | 1.8 km || 
|-id=012 bgcolor=#E9E9E9
| 179012 ||  || — || September 12, 2001 || Socorro || LINEAR || — || align=right | 1.6 km || 
|-id=013 bgcolor=#E9E9E9
| 179013 ||  || — || September 12, 2001 || Socorro || LINEAR || GEF || align=right | 1.9 km || 
|-id=014 bgcolor=#E9E9E9
| 179014 ||  || — || September 12, 2001 || Socorro || LINEAR || — || align=right | 2.6 km || 
|-id=015 bgcolor=#E9E9E9
| 179015 ||  || — || September 10, 2001 || Socorro || LINEAR || — || align=right | 1.5 km || 
|-id=016 bgcolor=#E9E9E9
| 179016 ||  || — || September 10, 2001 || Socorro || LINEAR || DOR || align=right | 4.6 km || 
|-id=017 bgcolor=#E9E9E9
| 179017 ||  || — || September 10, 2001 || Socorro || LINEAR || — || align=right | 2.0 km || 
|-id=018 bgcolor=#E9E9E9
| 179018 ||  || — || September 10, 2001 || Socorro || LINEAR || — || align=right | 3.3 km || 
|-id=019 bgcolor=#E9E9E9
| 179019 ||  || — || September 11, 2001 || Anderson Mesa || LONEOS || — || align=right | 2.5 km || 
|-id=020 bgcolor=#E9E9E9
| 179020 ||  || — || September 11, 2001 || Anderson Mesa || LONEOS || — || align=right | 3.1 km || 
|-id=021 bgcolor=#E9E9E9
| 179021 ||  || — || September 11, 2001 || Anderson Mesa || LONEOS || — || align=right | 2.2 km || 
|-id=022 bgcolor=#E9E9E9
| 179022 ||  || — || September 11, 2001 || Anderson Mesa || LONEOS || — || align=right | 3.6 km || 
|-id=023 bgcolor=#E9E9E9
| 179023 ||  || — || September 11, 2001 || Anderson Mesa || LONEOS || — || align=right | 2.7 km || 
|-id=024 bgcolor=#E9E9E9
| 179024 ||  || — || September 11, 2001 || Anderson Mesa || LONEOS || MRX || align=right | 2.2 km || 
|-id=025 bgcolor=#E9E9E9
| 179025 ||  || — || September 11, 2001 || Anderson Mesa || LONEOS || — || align=right | 3.6 km || 
|-id=026 bgcolor=#d6d6d6
| 179026 ||  || — || September 11, 2001 || Anderson Mesa || LONEOS || — || align=right | 3.4 km || 
|-id=027 bgcolor=#E9E9E9
| 179027 ||  || — || September 12, 2001 || Socorro || LINEAR || — || align=right | 1.7 km || 
|-id=028 bgcolor=#E9E9E9
| 179028 ||  || — || September 12, 2001 || Socorro || LINEAR || HEN || align=right | 1.8 km || 
|-id=029 bgcolor=#E9E9E9
| 179029 ||  || — || September 12, 2001 || Socorro || LINEAR || — || align=right | 1.8 km || 
|-id=030 bgcolor=#E9E9E9
| 179030 ||  || — || September 12, 2001 || Socorro || LINEAR || — || align=right | 1.4 km || 
|-id=031 bgcolor=#E9E9E9
| 179031 ||  || — || September 12, 2001 || Socorro || LINEAR || — || align=right | 2.9 km || 
|-id=032 bgcolor=#E9E9E9
| 179032 ||  || — || September 12, 2001 || Socorro || LINEAR || MRX || align=right | 2.6 km || 
|-id=033 bgcolor=#E9E9E9
| 179033 ||  || — || September 12, 2001 || Socorro || LINEAR || — || align=right | 2.0 km || 
|-id=034 bgcolor=#E9E9E9
| 179034 ||  || — || September 12, 2001 || Socorro || LINEAR || — || align=right | 1.9 km || 
|-id=035 bgcolor=#E9E9E9
| 179035 ||  || — || September 12, 2001 || Socorro || LINEAR || — || align=right | 3.4 km || 
|-id=036 bgcolor=#E9E9E9
| 179036 ||  || — || September 12, 2001 || Socorro || LINEAR || — || align=right | 3.4 km || 
|-id=037 bgcolor=#E9E9E9
| 179037 ||  || — || September 12, 2001 || Socorro || LINEAR || ADE || align=right | 3.0 km || 
|-id=038 bgcolor=#d6d6d6
| 179038 ||  || — || September 12, 2001 || Socorro || LINEAR || — || align=right | 3.1 km || 
|-id=039 bgcolor=#E9E9E9
| 179039 ||  || — || September 9, 2001 || Anderson Mesa || LONEOS || — || align=right | 2.8 km || 
|-id=040 bgcolor=#E9E9E9
| 179040 ||  || — || September 11, 2001 || Anderson Mesa || LONEOS || — || align=right | 1.4 km || 
|-id=041 bgcolor=#E9E9E9
| 179041 ||  || — || September 18, 2001 || Kitt Peak || Spacewatch || — || align=right | 3.8 km || 
|-id=042 bgcolor=#E9E9E9
| 179042 ||  || — || September 18, 2001 || Desert Eagle || W. K. Y. Yeung || — || align=right | 2.9 km || 
|-id=043 bgcolor=#E9E9E9
| 179043 ||  || — || September 16, 2001 || Socorro || LINEAR || WIT || align=right | 1.3 km || 
|-id=044 bgcolor=#E9E9E9
| 179044 ||  || — || September 16, 2001 || Socorro || LINEAR || — || align=right | 3.1 km || 
|-id=045 bgcolor=#E9E9E9
| 179045 ||  || — || September 16, 2001 || Socorro || LINEAR || — || align=right | 3.0 km || 
|-id=046 bgcolor=#E9E9E9
| 179046 ||  || — || September 16, 2001 || Socorro || LINEAR || WIT || align=right | 1.5 km || 
|-id=047 bgcolor=#E9E9E9
| 179047 ||  || — || September 16, 2001 || Socorro || LINEAR || — || align=right | 1.3 km || 
|-id=048 bgcolor=#E9E9E9
| 179048 ||  || — || September 16, 2001 || Socorro || LINEAR || — || align=right | 3.7 km || 
|-id=049 bgcolor=#E9E9E9
| 179049 ||  || — || September 16, 2001 || Socorro || LINEAR || — || align=right | 2.2 km || 
|-id=050 bgcolor=#E9E9E9
| 179050 ||  || — || September 16, 2001 || Socorro || LINEAR || — || align=right | 4.8 km || 
|-id=051 bgcolor=#E9E9E9
| 179051 ||  || — || September 16, 2001 || Socorro || LINEAR || — || align=right | 2.4 km || 
|-id=052 bgcolor=#E9E9E9
| 179052 ||  || — || September 16, 2001 || Socorro || LINEAR || — || align=right | 1.4 km || 
|-id=053 bgcolor=#E9E9E9
| 179053 ||  || — || September 16, 2001 || Socorro || LINEAR || — || align=right | 3.2 km || 
|-id=054 bgcolor=#E9E9E9
| 179054 ||  || — || September 16, 2001 || Socorro || LINEAR || — || align=right | 3.0 km || 
|-id=055 bgcolor=#E9E9E9
| 179055 ||  || — || September 16, 2001 || Socorro || LINEAR || EUN || align=right | 2.2 km || 
|-id=056 bgcolor=#E9E9E9
| 179056 ||  || — || September 17, 2001 || Socorro || LINEAR || — || align=right | 3.9 km || 
|-id=057 bgcolor=#E9E9E9
| 179057 ||  || — || September 17, 2001 || Socorro || LINEAR || — || align=right | 4.3 km || 
|-id=058 bgcolor=#E9E9E9
| 179058 ||  || — || September 18, 2001 || Anderson Mesa || LONEOS || — || align=right | 1.8 km || 
|-id=059 bgcolor=#E9E9E9
| 179059 ||  || — || September 19, 2001 || Socorro || LINEAR || — || align=right | 3.4 km || 
|-id=060 bgcolor=#E9E9E9
| 179060 ||  || — || September 20, 2001 || Socorro || LINEAR || BRU || align=right | 4.9 km || 
|-id=061 bgcolor=#E9E9E9
| 179061 ||  || — || September 20, 2001 || Socorro || LINEAR || MAR || align=right | 1.6 km || 
|-id=062 bgcolor=#E9E9E9
| 179062 ||  || — || September 20, 2001 || Socorro || LINEAR || KRM || align=right | 3.4 km || 
|-id=063 bgcolor=#E9E9E9
| 179063 ||  || — || September 20, 2001 || Socorro || LINEAR || AGN || align=right | 1.6 km || 
|-id=064 bgcolor=#E9E9E9
| 179064 ||  || — || September 20, 2001 || Socorro || LINEAR || WIT || align=right | 1.2 km || 
|-id=065 bgcolor=#E9E9E9
| 179065 ||  || — || September 20, 2001 || Socorro || LINEAR || — || align=right | 2.4 km || 
|-id=066 bgcolor=#d6d6d6
| 179066 ||  || — || September 20, 2001 || Socorro || LINEAR || — || align=right | 5.2 km || 
|-id=067 bgcolor=#E9E9E9
| 179067 ||  || — || September 20, 2001 || Socorro || LINEAR || — || align=right | 2.4 km || 
|-id=068 bgcolor=#E9E9E9
| 179068 ||  || — || September 20, 2001 || Socorro || LINEAR || — || align=right | 4.5 km || 
|-id=069 bgcolor=#E9E9E9
| 179069 ||  || — || September 16, 2001 || Socorro || LINEAR || — || align=right | 3.3 km || 
|-id=070 bgcolor=#E9E9E9
| 179070 ||  || — || September 16, 2001 || Socorro || LINEAR || — || align=right | 2.3 km || 
|-id=071 bgcolor=#E9E9E9
| 179071 ||  || — || September 16, 2001 || Socorro || LINEAR || — || align=right | 3.7 km || 
|-id=072 bgcolor=#E9E9E9
| 179072 ||  || — || September 16, 2001 || Socorro || LINEAR || — || align=right | 2.5 km || 
|-id=073 bgcolor=#E9E9E9
| 179073 ||  || — || September 16, 2001 || Socorro || LINEAR || AER || align=right | 2.7 km || 
|-id=074 bgcolor=#E9E9E9
| 179074 ||  || — || September 16, 2001 || Socorro || LINEAR || — || align=right | 3.2 km || 
|-id=075 bgcolor=#d6d6d6
| 179075 ||  || — || September 16, 2001 || Socorro || LINEAR || — || align=right | 3.1 km || 
|-id=076 bgcolor=#E9E9E9
| 179076 ||  || — || September 16, 2001 || Socorro || LINEAR || WIT || align=right | 1.7 km || 
|-id=077 bgcolor=#d6d6d6
| 179077 ||  || — || September 16, 2001 || Socorro || LINEAR || BRA || align=right | 1.8 km || 
|-id=078 bgcolor=#E9E9E9
| 179078 ||  || — || September 16, 2001 || Socorro || LINEAR || — || align=right | 3.0 km || 
|-id=079 bgcolor=#E9E9E9
| 179079 ||  || — || September 16, 2001 || Socorro || LINEAR || — || align=right | 3.2 km || 
|-id=080 bgcolor=#E9E9E9
| 179080 ||  || — || September 16, 2001 || Socorro || LINEAR || — || align=right | 3.5 km || 
|-id=081 bgcolor=#E9E9E9
| 179081 ||  || — || September 17, 2001 || Socorro || LINEAR || — || align=right | 2.7 km || 
|-id=082 bgcolor=#E9E9E9
| 179082 ||  || — || September 17, 2001 || Socorro || LINEAR || — || align=right | 2.7 km || 
|-id=083 bgcolor=#E9E9E9
| 179083 ||  || — || September 17, 2001 || Socorro || LINEAR || — || align=right | 4.5 km || 
|-id=084 bgcolor=#E9E9E9
| 179084 ||  || — || September 17, 2001 || Socorro || LINEAR || — || align=right | 2.7 km || 
|-id=085 bgcolor=#E9E9E9
| 179085 ||  || — || September 17, 2001 || Socorro || LINEAR || — || align=right | 3.0 km || 
|-id=086 bgcolor=#E9E9E9
| 179086 ||  || — || September 17, 2001 || Socorro || LINEAR || — || align=right | 4.0 km || 
|-id=087 bgcolor=#E9E9E9
| 179087 ||  || — || September 17, 2001 || Socorro || LINEAR || — || align=right | 2.0 km || 
|-id=088 bgcolor=#E9E9E9
| 179088 ||  || — || September 17, 2001 || Socorro || LINEAR || — || align=right | 2.4 km || 
|-id=089 bgcolor=#E9E9E9
| 179089 ||  || — || September 17, 2001 || Socorro || LINEAR || — || align=right | 1.7 km || 
|-id=090 bgcolor=#E9E9E9
| 179090 ||  || — || September 19, 2001 || Socorro || LINEAR || — || align=right | 2.1 km || 
|-id=091 bgcolor=#E9E9E9
| 179091 ||  || — || September 16, 2001 || Socorro || LINEAR || GEF || align=right | 2.0 km || 
|-id=092 bgcolor=#E9E9E9
| 179092 ||  || — || September 16, 2001 || Socorro || LINEAR || — || align=right | 2.6 km || 
|-id=093 bgcolor=#d6d6d6
| 179093 ||  || — || September 17, 2001 || Socorro || LINEAR || — || align=right | 4.0 km || 
|-id=094 bgcolor=#E9E9E9
| 179094 ||  || — || September 19, 2001 || Socorro || LINEAR || — || align=right | 1.5 km || 
|-id=095 bgcolor=#E9E9E9
| 179095 ||  || — || September 19, 2001 || Socorro || LINEAR || HOF || align=right | 3.9 km || 
|-id=096 bgcolor=#E9E9E9
| 179096 ||  || — || September 19, 2001 || Socorro || LINEAR || HEN || align=right | 1.2 km || 
|-id=097 bgcolor=#E9E9E9
| 179097 ||  || — || September 19, 2001 || Socorro || LINEAR || — || align=right | 2.9 km || 
|-id=098 bgcolor=#E9E9E9
| 179098 ||  || — || September 19, 2001 || Socorro || LINEAR || — || align=right | 2.1 km || 
|-id=099 bgcolor=#E9E9E9
| 179099 ||  || — || September 19, 2001 || Socorro || LINEAR || — || align=right | 1.4 km || 
|-id=100 bgcolor=#E9E9E9
| 179100 ||  || — || September 19, 2001 || Socorro || LINEAR || WIT || align=right | 1.5 km || 
|}

179101–179200 

|-bgcolor=#E9E9E9
| 179101 ||  || — || September 19, 2001 || Socorro || LINEAR || — || align=right | 1.7 km || 
|-id=102 bgcolor=#d6d6d6
| 179102 ||  || — || September 19, 2001 || Socorro || LINEAR || — || align=right | 2.6 km || 
|-id=103 bgcolor=#E9E9E9
| 179103 ||  || — || September 19, 2001 || Socorro || LINEAR || MAR || align=right | 1.6 km || 
|-id=104 bgcolor=#E9E9E9
| 179104 ||  || — || September 19, 2001 || Socorro || LINEAR || WIT || align=right | 1.6 km || 
|-id=105 bgcolor=#d6d6d6
| 179105 ||  || — || September 19, 2001 || Socorro || LINEAR || — || align=right | 2.7 km || 
|-id=106 bgcolor=#E9E9E9
| 179106 ||  || — || September 19, 2001 || Socorro || LINEAR || — || align=right | 2.3 km || 
|-id=107 bgcolor=#E9E9E9
| 179107 ||  || — || September 19, 2001 || Socorro || LINEAR || AST || align=right | 2.9 km || 
|-id=108 bgcolor=#E9E9E9
| 179108 ||  || — || September 19, 2001 || Socorro || LINEAR || — || align=right | 2.2 km || 
|-id=109 bgcolor=#E9E9E9
| 179109 ||  || — || September 19, 2001 || Socorro || LINEAR || — || align=right | 2.6 km || 
|-id=110 bgcolor=#E9E9E9
| 179110 ||  || — || September 19, 2001 || Socorro || LINEAR || — || align=right | 3.5 km || 
|-id=111 bgcolor=#E9E9E9
| 179111 ||  || — || September 19, 2001 || Socorro || LINEAR || — || align=right | 2.9 km || 
|-id=112 bgcolor=#E9E9E9
| 179112 ||  || — || September 19, 2001 || Socorro || LINEAR || — || align=right | 3.0 km || 
|-id=113 bgcolor=#E9E9E9
| 179113 ||  || — || September 19, 2001 || Socorro || LINEAR || — || align=right | 3.1 km || 
|-id=114 bgcolor=#E9E9E9
| 179114 ||  || — || September 19, 2001 || Socorro || LINEAR || — || align=right | 1.2 km || 
|-id=115 bgcolor=#d6d6d6
| 179115 ||  || — || September 19, 2001 || Socorro || LINEAR || — || align=right | 3.8 km || 
|-id=116 bgcolor=#E9E9E9
| 179116 ||  || — || September 19, 2001 || Socorro || LINEAR || HOF || align=right | 4.3 km || 
|-id=117 bgcolor=#E9E9E9
| 179117 ||  || — || September 19, 2001 || Socorro || LINEAR || WIT || align=right | 1.8 km || 
|-id=118 bgcolor=#E9E9E9
| 179118 ||  || — || September 19, 2001 || Socorro || LINEAR || — || align=right | 3.1 km || 
|-id=119 bgcolor=#E9E9E9
| 179119 ||  || — || September 19, 2001 || Socorro || LINEAR || — || align=right | 2.0 km || 
|-id=120 bgcolor=#d6d6d6
| 179120 ||  || — || September 19, 2001 || Socorro || LINEAR || — || align=right | 4.5 km || 
|-id=121 bgcolor=#E9E9E9
| 179121 ||  || — || September 19, 2001 || Socorro || LINEAR || — || align=right | 3.4 km || 
|-id=122 bgcolor=#E9E9E9
| 179122 ||  || — || September 19, 2001 || Socorro || LINEAR || — || align=right | 5.5 km || 
|-id=123 bgcolor=#E9E9E9
| 179123 ||  || — || September 20, 2001 || Socorro || LINEAR || HOF || align=right | 4.5 km || 
|-id=124 bgcolor=#E9E9E9
| 179124 ||  || — || September 25, 2001 || Desert Eagle || W. K. Y. Yeung || — || align=right | 2.5 km || 
|-id=125 bgcolor=#E9E9E9
| 179125 ||  || — || September 19, 2001 || Kitt Peak || Spacewatch || — || align=right | 2.5 km || 
|-id=126 bgcolor=#E9E9E9
| 179126 ||  || — || September 20, 2001 || Socorro || LINEAR || EUN || align=right | 1.7 km || 
|-id=127 bgcolor=#E9E9E9
| 179127 ||  || — || September 21, 2001 || Socorro || LINEAR || — || align=right | 3.6 km || 
|-id=128 bgcolor=#fefefe
| 179128 ||  || — || September 26, 2001 || Socorro || LINEAR || H || align=right | 1.1 km || 
|-id=129 bgcolor=#fefefe
| 179129 ||  || — || September 21, 2001 || Anderson Mesa || LONEOS || H || align=right | 1.1 km || 
|-id=130 bgcolor=#E9E9E9
| 179130 ||  || — || September 21, 2001 || Socorro || LINEAR || — || align=right | 1.8 km || 
|-id=131 bgcolor=#E9E9E9
| 179131 ||  || — || September 22, 2001 || Palomar || NEAT || — || align=right | 2.3 km || 
|-id=132 bgcolor=#E9E9E9
| 179132 ||  || — || September 16, 2001 || Socorro || LINEAR || WIT || align=right | 1.6 km || 
|-id=133 bgcolor=#C2FFFF
| 179133 ||  || — || September 19, 2001 || Socorro || LINEAR || L5 || align=right | 14 km || 
|-id=134 bgcolor=#E9E9E9
| 179134 ||  || — || September 20, 2001 || Socorro || LINEAR || — || align=right | 1.4 km || 
|-id=135 bgcolor=#E9E9E9
| 179135 ||  || — || September 20, 2001 || Socorro || LINEAR || — || align=right | 3.3 km || 
|-id=136 bgcolor=#E9E9E9
| 179136 ||  || — || September 20, 2001 || Socorro || LINEAR || — || align=right | 2.5 km || 
|-id=137 bgcolor=#E9E9E9
| 179137 ||  || — || September 20, 2001 || Socorro || LINEAR || — || align=right | 2.3 km || 
|-id=138 bgcolor=#d6d6d6
| 179138 ||  || — || September 18, 2001 || Anderson Mesa || LONEOS || EOS || align=right | 3.1 km || 
|-id=139 bgcolor=#E9E9E9
| 179139 ||  || — || September 21, 2001 || Socorro || LINEAR || — || align=right | 2.3 km || 
|-id=140 bgcolor=#E9E9E9
| 179140 ||  || — || September 21, 2001 || Socorro || LINEAR || — || align=right | 2.4 km || 
|-id=141 bgcolor=#E9E9E9
| 179141 ||  || — || September 17, 2001 || Kitt Peak || Spacewatch || — || align=right | 3.5 km || 
|-id=142 bgcolor=#E9E9E9
| 179142 ||  || — || September 18, 2001 || Palomar || NEAT || — || align=right | 6.4 km || 
|-id=143 bgcolor=#E9E9E9
| 179143 ||  || — || September 22, 2001 || Palomar || NEAT || — || align=right | 3.6 km || 
|-id=144 bgcolor=#E9E9E9
| 179144 ||  || — || September 23, 2001 || Palomar || NEAT || GEF || align=right | 2.5 km || 
|-id=145 bgcolor=#E9E9E9
| 179145 ||  || — || September 26, 2001 || Anderson Mesa || LONEOS || — || align=right | 1.4 km || 
|-id=146 bgcolor=#E9E9E9
| 179146 ||  || — || September 20, 2001 || Socorro || LINEAR || HOF || align=right | 3.1 km || 
|-id=147 bgcolor=#E9E9E9
| 179147 ||  || — || October 13, 2001 || Socorro || LINEAR || VIB || align=right | 4.0 km || 
|-id=148 bgcolor=#E9E9E9
| 179148 ||  || — || October 11, 2001 || Palomar || NEAT || DOR || align=right | 4.8 km || 
|-id=149 bgcolor=#fefefe
| 179149 ||  || — || October 11, 2001 || Socorro || LINEAR || H || align=right data-sort-value="0.89" | 890 m || 
|-id=150 bgcolor=#d6d6d6
| 179150 ||  || — || October 9, 2001 || Socorro || LINEAR || EOS || align=right | 5.5 km || 
|-id=151 bgcolor=#E9E9E9
| 179151 ||  || — || October 9, 2001 || Socorro || LINEAR || — || align=right | 2.3 km || 
|-id=152 bgcolor=#E9E9E9
| 179152 ||  || — || October 13, 2001 || Socorro || LINEAR || — || align=right | 3.1 km || 
|-id=153 bgcolor=#E9E9E9
| 179153 ||  || — || October 14, 2001 || Socorro || LINEAR || — || align=right | 2.1 km || 
|-id=154 bgcolor=#E9E9E9
| 179154 ||  || — || October 14, 2001 || Socorro || LINEAR || — || align=right | 3.1 km || 
|-id=155 bgcolor=#E9E9E9
| 179155 ||  || — || October 14, 2001 || Socorro || LINEAR || EUN || align=right | 1.6 km || 
|-id=156 bgcolor=#E9E9E9
| 179156 ||  || — || October 14, 2001 || Socorro || LINEAR || — || align=right | 2.7 km || 
|-id=157 bgcolor=#E9E9E9
| 179157 ||  || — || October 14, 2001 || Socorro || LINEAR || DOR || align=right | 4.5 km || 
|-id=158 bgcolor=#E9E9E9
| 179158 ||  || — || October 14, 2001 || Socorro || LINEAR || — || align=right | 4.7 km || 
|-id=159 bgcolor=#d6d6d6
| 179159 ||  || — || October 9, 2001 || Kitt Peak || Spacewatch || — || align=right | 4.0 km || 
|-id=160 bgcolor=#E9E9E9
| 179160 ||  || — || October 15, 2001 || Socorro || LINEAR || AGN || align=right | 1.9 km || 
|-id=161 bgcolor=#E9E9E9
| 179161 ||  || — || October 13, 2001 || Socorro || LINEAR || — || align=right | 2.4 km || 
|-id=162 bgcolor=#E9E9E9
| 179162 ||  || — || October 13, 2001 || Socorro || LINEAR || — || align=right | 2.5 km || 
|-id=163 bgcolor=#E9E9E9
| 179163 ||  || — || October 13, 2001 || Socorro || LINEAR || — || align=right | 3.9 km || 
|-id=164 bgcolor=#E9E9E9
| 179164 ||  || — || October 13, 2001 || Socorro || LINEAR || — || align=right | 4.5 km || 
|-id=165 bgcolor=#E9E9E9
| 179165 ||  || — || October 13, 2001 || Socorro || LINEAR || — || align=right | 5.4 km || 
|-id=166 bgcolor=#E9E9E9
| 179166 ||  || — || October 13, 2001 || Socorro || LINEAR || — || align=right | 4.0 km || 
|-id=167 bgcolor=#d6d6d6
| 179167 ||  || — || October 13, 2001 || Socorro || LINEAR || — || align=right | 4.2 km || 
|-id=168 bgcolor=#E9E9E9
| 179168 ||  || — || October 14, 2001 || Socorro || LINEAR || — || align=right | 3.6 km || 
|-id=169 bgcolor=#E9E9E9
| 179169 ||  || — || October 14, 2001 || Socorro || LINEAR || EUN || align=right | 2.1 km || 
|-id=170 bgcolor=#d6d6d6
| 179170 ||  || — || October 14, 2001 || Socorro || LINEAR || EOS || align=right | 3.1 km || 
|-id=171 bgcolor=#E9E9E9
| 179171 ||  || — || October 14, 2001 || Socorro || LINEAR || — || align=right | 3.8 km || 
|-id=172 bgcolor=#E9E9E9
| 179172 ||  || — || October 14, 2001 || Socorro || LINEAR || — || align=right | 3.9 km || 
|-id=173 bgcolor=#d6d6d6
| 179173 ||  || — || October 13, 2001 || Socorro || LINEAR || — || align=right | 3.3 km || 
|-id=174 bgcolor=#E9E9E9
| 179174 ||  || — || October 14, 2001 || Socorro || LINEAR || — || align=right | 1.7 km || 
|-id=175 bgcolor=#d6d6d6
| 179175 ||  || — || October 14, 2001 || Socorro || LINEAR || — || align=right | 3.5 km || 
|-id=176 bgcolor=#E9E9E9
| 179176 ||  || — || October 14, 2001 || Socorro || LINEAR || CLO || align=right | 3.1 km || 
|-id=177 bgcolor=#E9E9E9
| 179177 ||  || — || October 15, 2001 || Socorro || LINEAR || EUN || align=right | 2.4 km || 
|-id=178 bgcolor=#E9E9E9
| 179178 ||  || — || October 15, 2001 || Socorro || LINEAR || — || align=right | 5.1 km || 
|-id=179 bgcolor=#fefefe
| 179179 ||  || — || October 6, 2001 || Palomar || NEAT || H || align=right | 1.4 km || 
|-id=180 bgcolor=#E9E9E9
| 179180 ||  || — || October 13, 2001 || Kitt Peak || Spacewatch || — || align=right | 2.0 km || 
|-id=181 bgcolor=#E9E9E9
| 179181 ||  || — || October 13, 2001 || Palomar || NEAT || — || align=right | 2.2 km || 
|-id=182 bgcolor=#E9E9E9
| 179182 ||  || — || October 13, 2001 || Palomar || NEAT || EUN || align=right | 2.0 km || 
|-id=183 bgcolor=#E9E9E9
| 179183 ||  || — || October 10, 2001 || Palomar || NEAT || WIT || align=right | 1.4 km || 
|-id=184 bgcolor=#d6d6d6
| 179184 ||  || — || October 10, 2001 || Palomar || NEAT || — || align=right | 4.5 km || 
|-id=185 bgcolor=#E9E9E9
| 179185 ||  || — || October 10, 2001 || Palomar || NEAT || — || align=right | 3.4 km || 
|-id=186 bgcolor=#E9E9E9
| 179186 ||  || — || October 10, 2001 || Palomar || NEAT || — || align=right | 3.1 km || 
|-id=187 bgcolor=#E9E9E9
| 179187 ||  || — || October 10, 2001 || Palomar || NEAT || — || align=right | 2.7 km || 
|-id=188 bgcolor=#d6d6d6
| 179188 ||  || — || October 10, 2001 || Palomar || NEAT || — || align=right | 3.1 km || 
|-id=189 bgcolor=#E9E9E9
| 179189 ||  || — || October 10, 2001 || Palomar || NEAT || — || align=right | 2.9 km || 
|-id=190 bgcolor=#C2FFFF
| 179190 ||  || — || October 15, 2001 || Palomar || NEAT || L5 || align=right | 16 km || 
|-id=191 bgcolor=#d6d6d6
| 179191 ||  || — || October 14, 2001 || Kitt Peak || Spacewatch || KOR || align=right | 1.6 km || 
|-id=192 bgcolor=#E9E9E9
| 179192 ||  || — || October 11, 2001 || Palomar || NEAT || — || align=right | 2.1 km || 
|-id=193 bgcolor=#E9E9E9
| 179193 ||  || — || October 11, 2001 || Palomar || NEAT || — || align=right | 2.4 km || 
|-id=194 bgcolor=#E9E9E9
| 179194 ||  || — || October 11, 2001 || Palomar || NEAT || — || align=right | 2.9 km || 
|-id=195 bgcolor=#E9E9E9
| 179195 ||  || — || October 11, 2001 || Palomar || NEAT || WIT || align=right | 1.3 km || 
|-id=196 bgcolor=#E9E9E9
| 179196 ||  || — || October 11, 2001 || Palomar || NEAT || — || align=right | 3.2 km || 
|-id=197 bgcolor=#E9E9E9
| 179197 ||  || — || October 13, 2001 || Socorro || LINEAR || — || align=right | 2.6 km || 
|-id=198 bgcolor=#E9E9E9
| 179198 ||  || — || October 13, 2001 || Socorro || LINEAR || — || align=right | 2.3 km || 
|-id=199 bgcolor=#E9E9E9
| 179199 ||  || — || October 14, 2001 || Socorro || LINEAR || — || align=right | 3.2 km || 
|-id=200 bgcolor=#E9E9E9
| 179200 ||  || — || October 14, 2001 || Socorro || LINEAR || — || align=right | 2.6 km || 
|}

179201–179300 

|-bgcolor=#E9E9E9
| 179201 ||  || — || October 14, 2001 || Socorro || LINEAR || WIT || align=right | 1.5 km || 
|-id=202 bgcolor=#d6d6d6
| 179202 ||  || — || October 14, 2001 || Socorro || LINEAR || — || align=right | 4.0 km || 
|-id=203 bgcolor=#E9E9E9
| 179203 ||  || — || October 14, 2001 || Socorro || LINEAR || — || align=right | 3.3 km || 
|-id=204 bgcolor=#d6d6d6
| 179204 ||  || — || October 14, 2001 || Socorro || LINEAR || — || align=right | 4.3 km || 
|-id=205 bgcolor=#d6d6d6
| 179205 ||  || — || October 14, 2001 || Socorro || LINEAR || — || align=right | 3.0 km || 
|-id=206 bgcolor=#E9E9E9
| 179206 ||  || — || October 14, 2001 || Socorro || LINEAR || — || align=right | 2.6 km || 
|-id=207 bgcolor=#E9E9E9
| 179207 ||  || — || October 15, 2001 || Palomar || NEAT || — || align=right | 1.6 km || 
|-id=208 bgcolor=#d6d6d6
| 179208 ||  || — || October 11, 2001 || Socorro || LINEAR || — || align=right | 4.5 km || 
|-id=209 bgcolor=#E9E9E9
| 179209 ||  || — || October 11, 2001 || Socorro || LINEAR || GEF || align=right | 2.1 km || 
|-id=210 bgcolor=#E9E9E9
| 179210 ||  || — || October 11, 2001 || Socorro || LINEAR || — || align=right | 2.4 km || 
|-id=211 bgcolor=#E9E9E9
| 179211 ||  || — || October 11, 2001 || Palomar || NEAT || — || align=right | 1.8 km || 
|-id=212 bgcolor=#E9E9E9
| 179212 ||  || — || October 13, 2001 || Anderson Mesa || LONEOS || JUN || align=right | 1.7 km || 
|-id=213 bgcolor=#E9E9E9
| 179213 ||  || — || October 14, 2001 || Palomar || NEAT || — || align=right | 3.0 km || 
|-id=214 bgcolor=#E9E9E9
| 179214 ||  || — || October 14, 2001 || Anderson Mesa || LONEOS || — || align=right | 2.3 km || 
|-id=215 bgcolor=#E9E9E9
| 179215 ||  || — || October 14, 2001 || Socorro || LINEAR || — || align=right | 3.3 km || 
|-id=216 bgcolor=#E9E9E9
| 179216 ||  || — || October 14, 2001 || Socorro || LINEAR || — || align=right | 3.7 km || 
|-id=217 bgcolor=#C2FFFF
| 179217 ||  || — || October 14, 2001 || Kitt Peak || Spacewatch || L5 || align=right | 8.9 km || 
|-id=218 bgcolor=#d6d6d6
| 179218 ||  || — || October 14, 2001 || Socorro || LINEAR || — || align=right | 4.6 km || 
|-id=219 bgcolor=#fefefe
| 179219 ||  || — || October 14, 2001 || Eskridge || Farpoint Obs. || — || align=right | 2.0 km || 
|-id=220 bgcolor=#d6d6d6
| 179220 ||  || — || October 13, 2001 || Kitt Peak || Spacewatch || K-2 || align=right | 2.1 km || 
|-id=221 bgcolor=#E9E9E9
| 179221 Hrvojebožić ||  ||  || October 14, 2001 || Apache Point || SDSS || AGN || align=right | 1.4 km || 
|-id=222 bgcolor=#d6d6d6
| 179222 ||  || — || October 13, 2001 || Kitt Peak || Spacewatch || KOR || align=right | 1.6 km || 
|-id=223 bgcolor=#E9E9E9
| 179223 Tonytyson ||  ||  || October 15, 2001 || Apache Point || SDSS || PAD || align=right | 4.1 km || 
|-id=224 bgcolor=#fefefe
| 179224 ||  || — || October 18, 2001 || Socorro || LINEAR || H || align=right | 1.0 km || 
|-id=225 bgcolor=#E9E9E9
| 179225 ||  || — || October 17, 2001 || Socorro || LINEAR || — || align=right | 2.9 km || 
|-id=226 bgcolor=#d6d6d6
| 179226 ||  || — || October 22, 2001 || Desert Eagle || W. K. Y. Yeung || — || align=right | 4.4 km || 
|-id=227 bgcolor=#fefefe
| 179227 ||  || — || October 21, 2001 || Socorro || LINEAR || H || align=right | 1.0 km || 
|-id=228 bgcolor=#d6d6d6
| 179228 ||  || — || October 24, 2001 || Desert Eagle || W. K. Y. Yeung || — || align=right | 4.2 km || 
|-id=229 bgcolor=#E9E9E9
| 179229 ||  || — || October 16, 2001 || Palomar || NEAT || — || align=right | 2.5 km || 
|-id=230 bgcolor=#E9E9E9
| 179230 ||  || — || October 18, 2001 || Palomar || NEAT || — || align=right | 3.2 km || 
|-id=231 bgcolor=#E9E9E9
| 179231 ||  || — || October 16, 2001 || Socorro || LINEAR || — || align=right | 1.9 km || 
|-id=232 bgcolor=#d6d6d6
| 179232 ||  || — || October 17, 2001 || Socorro || LINEAR || — || align=right | 3.5 km || 
|-id=233 bgcolor=#C2FFFF
| 179233 ||  || — || October 17, 2001 || Socorro || LINEAR || L5 || align=right | 13 km || 
|-id=234 bgcolor=#d6d6d6
| 179234 ||  || — || October 17, 2001 || Socorro || LINEAR || K-2 || align=right | 2.1 km || 
|-id=235 bgcolor=#E9E9E9
| 179235 ||  || — || October 18, 2001 || Socorro || LINEAR || — || align=right | 3.1 km || 
|-id=236 bgcolor=#E9E9E9
| 179236 ||  || — || October 17, 2001 || Kitt Peak || Spacewatch || — || align=right | 3.2 km || 
|-id=237 bgcolor=#E9E9E9
| 179237 ||  || — || October 20, 2001 || Socorro || LINEAR || — || align=right | 3.1 km || 
|-id=238 bgcolor=#E9E9E9
| 179238 ||  || — || October 20, 2001 || Socorro || LINEAR || — || align=right | 3.0 km || 
|-id=239 bgcolor=#d6d6d6
| 179239 ||  || — || October 21, 2001 || Socorro || LINEAR || — || align=right | 2.7 km || 
|-id=240 bgcolor=#d6d6d6
| 179240 ||  || — || October 18, 2001 || Kitt Peak || Spacewatch || — || align=right | 2.3 km || 
|-id=241 bgcolor=#E9E9E9
| 179241 ||  || — || October 23, 2001 || Socorro || LINEAR || HOF || align=right | 2.8 km || 
|-id=242 bgcolor=#E9E9E9
| 179242 ||  || — || October 17, 2001 || Socorro || LINEAR || AGN || align=right | 2.1 km || 
|-id=243 bgcolor=#d6d6d6
| 179243 ||  || — || October 17, 2001 || Socorro || LINEAR || TRP || align=right | 5.4 km || 
|-id=244 bgcolor=#C2FFFF
| 179244 ||  || — || October 18, 2001 || Socorro || LINEAR || L5 || align=right | 13 km || 
|-id=245 bgcolor=#E9E9E9
| 179245 ||  || — || October 20, 2001 || Socorro || LINEAR || — || align=right | 3.4 km || 
|-id=246 bgcolor=#E9E9E9
| 179246 ||  || — || October 20, 2001 || Socorro || LINEAR || — || align=right | 2.9 km || 
|-id=247 bgcolor=#E9E9E9
| 179247 ||  || — || October 20, 2001 || Socorro || LINEAR || DOR || align=right | 4.0 km || 
|-id=248 bgcolor=#d6d6d6
| 179248 ||  || — || October 20, 2001 || Socorro || LINEAR || K-2 || align=right | 2.0 km || 
|-id=249 bgcolor=#E9E9E9
| 179249 ||  || — || October 20, 2001 || Socorro || LINEAR || PAD || align=right | 3.2 km || 
|-id=250 bgcolor=#d6d6d6
| 179250 ||  || — || October 20, 2001 || Socorro || LINEAR || — || align=right | 3.2 km || 
|-id=251 bgcolor=#E9E9E9
| 179251 ||  || — || October 21, 2001 || Socorro || LINEAR || — || align=right | 2.8 km || 
|-id=252 bgcolor=#E9E9E9
| 179252 ||  || — || October 20, 2001 || Socorro || LINEAR || BRU || align=right | 4.0 km || 
|-id=253 bgcolor=#E9E9E9
| 179253 ||  || — || October 20, 2001 || Socorro || LINEAR || — || align=right | 2.3 km || 
|-id=254 bgcolor=#d6d6d6
| 179254 ||  || — || October 20, 2001 || Socorro || LINEAR || KOR || align=right | 2.0 km || 
|-id=255 bgcolor=#d6d6d6
| 179255 ||  || — || October 21, 2001 || Socorro || LINEAR || — || align=right | 5.3 km || 
|-id=256 bgcolor=#fefefe
| 179256 ||  || — || October 23, 2001 || Socorro || LINEAR || H || align=right | 1.3 km || 
|-id=257 bgcolor=#E9E9E9
| 179257 ||  || — || October 23, 2001 || Socorro || LINEAR || AGN || align=right | 1.5 km || 
|-id=258 bgcolor=#E9E9E9
| 179258 ||  || — || October 23, 2001 || Socorro || LINEAR || AGN || align=right | 1.7 km || 
|-id=259 bgcolor=#E9E9E9
| 179259 ||  || — || October 23, 2001 || Socorro || LINEAR || HOF || align=right | 4.5 km || 
|-id=260 bgcolor=#E9E9E9
| 179260 ||  || — || October 23, 2001 || Socorro || LINEAR || — || align=right | 1.7 km || 
|-id=261 bgcolor=#d6d6d6
| 179261 ||  || — || October 23, 2001 || Socorro || LINEAR || — || align=right | 4.0 km || 
|-id=262 bgcolor=#E9E9E9
| 179262 ||  || — || October 23, 2001 || Socorro || LINEAR || — || align=right | 5.0 km || 
|-id=263 bgcolor=#d6d6d6
| 179263 ||  || — || October 23, 2001 || Socorro || LINEAR || — || align=right | 2.7 km || 
|-id=264 bgcolor=#E9E9E9
| 179264 ||  || — || October 23, 2001 || Palomar || NEAT || — || align=right | 2.1 km || 
|-id=265 bgcolor=#E9E9E9
| 179265 ||  || — || October 20, 2001 || Kitt Peak || Spacewatch || — || align=right | 1.9 km || 
|-id=266 bgcolor=#E9E9E9
| 179266 ||  || — || October 21, 2001 || Socorro || LINEAR || — || align=right | 3.1 km || 
|-id=267 bgcolor=#d6d6d6
| 179267 ||  || — || October 23, 2001 || Socorro || LINEAR || 629 || align=right | 2.3 km || 
|-id=268 bgcolor=#E9E9E9
| 179268 ||  || — || October 17, 2001 || Palomar || NEAT || — || align=right | 3.1 km || 
|-id=269 bgcolor=#E9E9E9
| 179269 ||  || — || October 18, 2001 || Palomar || NEAT || NEM || align=right | 3.4 km || 
|-id=270 bgcolor=#d6d6d6
| 179270 ||  || — || October 18, 2001 || Palomar || NEAT || THM || align=right | 3.0 km || 
|-id=271 bgcolor=#E9E9E9
| 179271 ||  || — || October 19, 2001 || Palomar || NEAT || AGN || align=right | 1.6 km || 
|-id=272 bgcolor=#E9E9E9
| 179272 ||  || — || October 19, 2001 || Palomar || NEAT || — || align=right | 1.9 km || 
|-id=273 bgcolor=#E9E9E9
| 179273 ||  || — || October 19, 2001 || Palomar || NEAT || AGN || align=right | 2.0 km || 
|-id=274 bgcolor=#E9E9E9
| 179274 ||  || — || October 23, 2001 || Socorro || LINEAR || HEN || align=right | 1.5 km || 
|-id=275 bgcolor=#E9E9E9
| 179275 ||  || — || October 23, 2001 || Socorro || LINEAR || — || align=right | 3.2 km || 
|-id=276 bgcolor=#fefefe
| 179276 ||  || — || October 25, 2001 || Socorro || LINEAR || H || align=right | 1.0 km || 
|-id=277 bgcolor=#E9E9E9
| 179277 ||  || — || October 21, 2001 || Socorro || LINEAR || HEN || align=right | 1.6 km || 
|-id=278 bgcolor=#E9E9E9
| 179278 ||  || — || October 24, 2001 || Socorro || LINEAR || — || align=right | 3.1 km || 
|-id=279 bgcolor=#d6d6d6
| 179279 ||  || — || October 26, 2001 || Kitt Peak || Spacewatch || — || align=right | 4.4 km || 
|-id=280 bgcolor=#E9E9E9
| 179280 ||  || — || October 16, 2001 || Palomar || NEAT || AEO || align=right | 1.9 km || 
|-id=281 bgcolor=#fefefe
| 179281 ||  || — || November 10, 2001 || Socorro || LINEAR || H || align=right | 1.4 km || 
|-id=282 bgcolor=#d6d6d6
| 179282 ||  || — || November 9, 2001 || Socorro || LINEAR || — || align=right | 3.3 km || 
|-id=283 bgcolor=#d6d6d6
| 179283 ||  || — || November 9, 2001 || Socorro || LINEAR || — || align=right | 4.2 km || 
|-id=284 bgcolor=#E9E9E9
| 179284 ||  || — || November 9, 2001 || Socorro || LINEAR || — || align=right | 1.6 km || 
|-id=285 bgcolor=#E9E9E9
| 179285 ||  || — || November 10, 2001 || Socorro || LINEAR || — || align=right | 4.4 km || 
|-id=286 bgcolor=#E9E9E9
| 179286 ||  || — || November 10, 2001 || Socorro || LINEAR || — || align=right | 3.6 km || 
|-id=287 bgcolor=#d6d6d6
| 179287 ||  || — || November 9, 2001 || Socorro || LINEAR || — || align=right | 4.1 km || 
|-id=288 bgcolor=#E9E9E9
| 179288 ||  || — || November 9, 2001 || Socorro || LINEAR || — || align=right | 2.8 km || 
|-id=289 bgcolor=#d6d6d6
| 179289 ||  || — || November 9, 2001 || Socorro || LINEAR || — || align=right | 3.9 km || 
|-id=290 bgcolor=#E9E9E9
| 179290 ||  || — || November 9, 2001 || Socorro || LINEAR || — || align=right | 4.4 km || 
|-id=291 bgcolor=#d6d6d6
| 179291 ||  || — || November 9, 2001 || Socorro || LINEAR || — || align=right | 5.2 km || 
|-id=292 bgcolor=#d6d6d6
| 179292 ||  || — || November 10, 2001 || Socorro || LINEAR || — || align=right | 4.1 km || 
|-id=293 bgcolor=#d6d6d6
| 179293 ||  || — || November 10, 2001 || Socorro || LINEAR || EOS || align=right | 2.6 km || 
|-id=294 bgcolor=#E9E9E9
| 179294 ||  || — || November 10, 2001 || Socorro || LINEAR || — || align=right | 3.3 km || 
|-id=295 bgcolor=#E9E9E9
| 179295 ||  || — || November 10, 2001 || Socorro || LINEAR || — || align=right | 4.3 km || 
|-id=296 bgcolor=#E9E9E9
| 179296 ||  || — || November 10, 2001 || Socorro || LINEAR || PAD || align=right | 3.4 km || 
|-id=297 bgcolor=#E9E9E9
| 179297 ||  || — || November 10, 2001 || Socorro || LINEAR || — || align=right | 3.9 km || 
|-id=298 bgcolor=#d6d6d6
| 179298 ||  || — || November 11, 2001 || Socorro || LINEAR || — || align=right | 5.5 km || 
|-id=299 bgcolor=#d6d6d6
| 179299 ||  || — || November 9, 2001 || Palomar || NEAT || EUP || align=right | 7.3 km || 
|-id=300 bgcolor=#d6d6d6
| 179300 ||  || — || November 10, 2001 || Palomar || NEAT || — || align=right | 3.5 km || 
|}

179301–179400 

|-bgcolor=#E9E9E9
| 179301 ||  || — || November 12, 2001 || Socorro || LINEAR || PAD || align=right | 3.6 km || 
|-id=302 bgcolor=#E9E9E9
| 179302 ||  || — || November 12, 2001 || Socorro || LINEAR || — || align=right | 3.2 km || 
|-id=303 bgcolor=#E9E9E9
| 179303 ||  || — || November 12, 2001 || Socorro || LINEAR || — || align=right | 4.1 km || 
|-id=304 bgcolor=#d6d6d6
| 179304 ||  || — || November 15, 2001 || Socorro || LINEAR || — || align=right | 4.0 km || 
|-id=305 bgcolor=#d6d6d6
| 179305 ||  || — || November 15, 2001 || Socorro || LINEAR || — || align=right | 4.1 km || 
|-id=306 bgcolor=#d6d6d6
| 179306 ||  || — || November 15, 2001 || Socorro || LINEAR || — || align=right | 4.1 km || 
|-id=307 bgcolor=#E9E9E9
| 179307 ||  || — || November 12, 2001 || Socorro || LINEAR || — || align=right | 2.5 km || 
|-id=308 bgcolor=#E9E9E9
| 179308 ||  || — || November 12, 2001 || Socorro || LINEAR || — || align=right | 2.8 km || 
|-id=309 bgcolor=#d6d6d6
| 179309 ||  || — || November 12, 2001 || Socorro || LINEAR || — || align=right | 3.6 km || 
|-id=310 bgcolor=#E9E9E9
| 179310 ||  || — || November 12, 2001 || Socorro || LINEAR || HOF || align=right | 4.5 km || 
|-id=311 bgcolor=#E9E9E9
| 179311 ||  || — || November 14, 2001 || Kitt Peak || Spacewatch || HEN || align=right | 1.6 km || 
|-id=312 bgcolor=#d6d6d6
| 179312 ||  || — || November 14, 2001 || Kitt Peak || Spacewatch || THM || align=right | 2.5 km || 
|-id=313 bgcolor=#E9E9E9
| 179313 ||  || — || November 17, 2001 || Socorro || LINEAR || — || align=right | 3.6 km || 
|-id=314 bgcolor=#E9E9E9
| 179314 ||  || — || November 17, 2001 || Socorro || LINEAR || PAD || align=right | 2.5 km || 
|-id=315 bgcolor=#E9E9E9
| 179315 ||  || — || November 17, 2001 || Socorro || LINEAR || HEN || align=right | 1.6 km || 
|-id=316 bgcolor=#E9E9E9
| 179316 ||  || — || November 17, 2001 || Socorro || LINEAR || — || align=right | 3.2 km || 
|-id=317 bgcolor=#E9E9E9
| 179317 ||  || — || November 18, 2001 || Socorro || LINEAR || — || align=right | 3.4 km || 
|-id=318 bgcolor=#E9E9E9
| 179318 ||  || — || November 17, 2001 || Kitt Peak || Spacewatch || — || align=right | 3.4 km || 
|-id=319 bgcolor=#E9E9E9
| 179319 ||  || — || November 17, 2001 || Kitt Peak || Spacewatch || — || align=right | 3.0 km || 
|-id=320 bgcolor=#d6d6d6
| 179320 ||  || — || November 17, 2001 || Socorro || LINEAR || KOR || align=right | 1.9 km || 
|-id=321 bgcolor=#d6d6d6
| 179321 ||  || — || November 17, 2001 || Socorro || LINEAR || — || align=right | 3.7 km || 
|-id=322 bgcolor=#d6d6d6
| 179322 ||  || — || November 18, 2001 || Socorro || LINEAR || KOR || align=right | 1.9 km || 
|-id=323 bgcolor=#E9E9E9
| 179323 ||  || — || November 19, 2001 || Socorro || LINEAR || — || align=right | 2.9 km || 
|-id=324 bgcolor=#d6d6d6
| 179324 ||  || — || November 19, 2001 || Socorro || LINEAR || — || align=right | 3.2 km || 
|-id=325 bgcolor=#E9E9E9
| 179325 ||  || — || November 19, 2001 || Anderson Mesa || LONEOS || — || align=right | 4.4 km || 
|-id=326 bgcolor=#E9E9E9
| 179326 ||  || — || November 19, 2001 || Socorro || LINEAR || — || align=right | 2.9 km || 
|-id=327 bgcolor=#E9E9E9
| 179327 ||  || — || November 19, 2001 || Socorro || LINEAR || — || align=right | 1.8 km || 
|-id=328 bgcolor=#d6d6d6
| 179328 ||  || — || November 19, 2001 || Socorro || LINEAR || KOR || align=right | 1.7 km || 
|-id=329 bgcolor=#E9E9E9
| 179329 ||  || — || November 19, 2001 || Socorro || LINEAR || — || align=right | 3.5 km || 
|-id=330 bgcolor=#d6d6d6
| 179330 ||  || — || November 20, 2001 || Socorro || LINEAR || — || align=right | 3.0 km || 
|-id=331 bgcolor=#d6d6d6
| 179331 ||  || — || November 20, 2001 || Socorro || LINEAR || — || align=right | 2.6 km || 
|-id=332 bgcolor=#E9E9E9
| 179332 ||  || — || November 18, 2001 || Kitt Peak || Spacewatch || — || align=right | 2.2 km || 
|-id=333 bgcolor=#d6d6d6
| 179333 ||  || — || December 9, 2001 || Socorro || LINEAR || CHA || align=right | 3.5 km || 
|-id=334 bgcolor=#d6d6d6
| 179334 ||  || — || December 9, 2001 || Socorro || LINEAR || — || align=right | 4.9 km || 
|-id=335 bgcolor=#d6d6d6
| 179335 ||  || — || December 9, 2001 || Socorro || LINEAR || — || align=right | 5.8 km || 
|-id=336 bgcolor=#E9E9E9
| 179336 ||  || — || December 9, 2001 || Socorro || LINEAR || EUN || align=right | 2.6 km || 
|-id=337 bgcolor=#d6d6d6
| 179337 ||  || — || December 9, 2001 || Socorro || LINEAR || — || align=right | 4.6 km || 
|-id=338 bgcolor=#d6d6d6
| 179338 ||  || — || December 9, 2001 || Socorro || LINEAR || — || align=right | 5.6 km || 
|-id=339 bgcolor=#d6d6d6
| 179339 ||  || — || December 10, 2001 || Socorro || LINEAR || — || align=right | 4.8 km || 
|-id=340 bgcolor=#d6d6d6
| 179340 ||  || — || December 11, 2001 || Socorro || LINEAR || EOS || align=right | 3.0 km || 
|-id=341 bgcolor=#d6d6d6
| 179341 ||  || — || December 11, 2001 || Socorro || LINEAR || EOS || align=right | 2.9 km || 
|-id=342 bgcolor=#E9E9E9
| 179342 ||  || — || December 10, 2001 || Socorro || LINEAR || — || align=right | 3.5 km || 
|-id=343 bgcolor=#E9E9E9
| 179343 ||  || — || December 10, 2001 || Socorro || LINEAR || HOF || align=right | 3.6 km || 
|-id=344 bgcolor=#d6d6d6
| 179344 ||  || — || December 10, 2001 || Socorro || LINEAR || KOR || align=right | 2.7 km || 
|-id=345 bgcolor=#d6d6d6
| 179345 ||  || — || December 10, 2001 || Socorro || LINEAR || — || align=right | 4.2 km || 
|-id=346 bgcolor=#d6d6d6
| 179346 ||  || — || December 10, 2001 || Socorro || LINEAR || TEL || align=right | 4.7 km || 
|-id=347 bgcolor=#d6d6d6
| 179347 ||  || — || December 13, 2001 || Socorro || LINEAR || — || align=right | 6.2 km || 
|-id=348 bgcolor=#E9E9E9
| 179348 ||  || — || December 14, 2001 || Socorro || LINEAR || — || align=right | 3.1 km || 
|-id=349 bgcolor=#E9E9E9
| 179349 ||  || — || December 14, 2001 || Socorro || LINEAR || — || align=right | 3.0 km || 
|-id=350 bgcolor=#E9E9E9
| 179350 ||  || — || December 14, 2001 || Socorro || LINEAR || — || align=right | 2.1 km || 
|-id=351 bgcolor=#d6d6d6
| 179351 ||  || — || December 14, 2001 || Socorro || LINEAR || — || align=right | 3.5 km || 
|-id=352 bgcolor=#E9E9E9
| 179352 ||  || — || December 14, 2001 || Socorro || LINEAR || — || align=right | 3.3 km || 
|-id=353 bgcolor=#d6d6d6
| 179353 ||  || — || December 14, 2001 || Socorro || LINEAR || — || align=right | 3.7 km || 
|-id=354 bgcolor=#E9E9E9
| 179354 ||  || — || December 14, 2001 || Socorro || LINEAR || HOF || align=right | 4.9 km || 
|-id=355 bgcolor=#d6d6d6
| 179355 ||  || — || December 14, 2001 || Socorro || LINEAR || EOS || align=right | 2.8 km || 
|-id=356 bgcolor=#d6d6d6
| 179356 ||  || — || December 14, 2001 || Socorro || LINEAR || KOR || align=right | 2.1 km || 
|-id=357 bgcolor=#d6d6d6
| 179357 ||  || — || December 14, 2001 || Socorro || LINEAR || — || align=right | 3.7 km || 
|-id=358 bgcolor=#d6d6d6
| 179358 ||  || — || December 14, 2001 || Socorro || LINEAR || EOS || align=right | 3.6 km || 
|-id=359 bgcolor=#d6d6d6
| 179359 ||  || — || December 14, 2001 || Socorro || LINEAR || — || align=right | 5.6 km || 
|-id=360 bgcolor=#d6d6d6
| 179360 ||  || — || December 14, 2001 || Socorro || LINEAR || THM || align=right | 2.9 km || 
|-id=361 bgcolor=#d6d6d6
| 179361 ||  || — || December 14, 2001 || Socorro || LINEAR || — || align=right | 3.4 km || 
|-id=362 bgcolor=#d6d6d6
| 179362 ||  || — || December 14, 2001 || Socorro || LINEAR || — || align=right | 5.6 km || 
|-id=363 bgcolor=#d6d6d6
| 179363 ||  || — || December 14, 2001 || Kitt Peak || Spacewatch || THM || align=right | 2.8 km || 
|-id=364 bgcolor=#d6d6d6
| 179364 ||  || — || December 11, 2001 || Socorro || LINEAR || — || align=right | 4.6 km || 
|-id=365 bgcolor=#d6d6d6
| 179365 ||  || — || December 11, 2001 || Socorro || LINEAR || MEL || align=right | 4.6 km || 
|-id=366 bgcolor=#d6d6d6
| 179366 ||  || — || December 11, 2001 || Socorro || LINEAR || — || align=right | 4.4 km || 
|-id=367 bgcolor=#d6d6d6
| 179367 ||  || — || December 14, 2001 || Socorro || LINEAR || EOS || align=right | 3.1 km || 
|-id=368 bgcolor=#d6d6d6
| 179368 ||  || — || December 15, 2001 || Socorro || LINEAR || — || align=right | 4.0 km || 
|-id=369 bgcolor=#d6d6d6
| 179369 ||  || — || December 15, 2001 || Socorro || LINEAR || — || align=right | 4.5 km || 
|-id=370 bgcolor=#d6d6d6
| 179370 ||  || — || December 15, 2001 || Socorro || LINEAR || — || align=right | 4.1 km || 
|-id=371 bgcolor=#d6d6d6
| 179371 ||  || — || December 15, 2001 || Socorro || LINEAR || — || align=right | 4.2 km || 
|-id=372 bgcolor=#d6d6d6
| 179372 ||  || — || December 15, 2001 || Socorro || LINEAR || — || align=right | 3.1 km || 
|-id=373 bgcolor=#d6d6d6
| 179373 ||  || — || December 15, 2001 || Socorro || LINEAR || EOS || align=right | 2.8 km || 
|-id=374 bgcolor=#d6d6d6
| 179374 ||  || — || December 15, 2001 || Socorro || LINEAR || — || align=right | 3.4 km || 
|-id=375 bgcolor=#d6d6d6
| 179375 ||  || — || December 15, 2001 || Socorro || LINEAR || — || align=right | 2.8 km || 
|-id=376 bgcolor=#d6d6d6
| 179376 ||  || — || December 15, 2001 || Socorro || LINEAR || EOS || align=right | 3.5 km || 
|-id=377 bgcolor=#d6d6d6
| 179377 ||  || — || December 15, 2001 || Socorro || LINEAR || — || align=right | 5.0 km || 
|-id=378 bgcolor=#E9E9E9
| 179378 ||  || — || December 15, 2001 || Socorro || LINEAR || — || align=right | 2.8 km || 
|-id=379 bgcolor=#d6d6d6
| 179379 ||  || — || December 13, 2001 || Xinglong || SCAP || — || align=right | 6.8 km || 
|-id=380 bgcolor=#d6d6d6
| 179380 ||  || — || December 7, 2001 || Socorro || LINEAR || — || align=right | 3.9 km || 
|-id=381 bgcolor=#d6d6d6
| 179381 ||  || — || December 7, 2001 || Haleakala || NEAT || — || align=right | 5.2 km || 
|-id=382 bgcolor=#d6d6d6
| 179382 ||  || — || December 23, 2001 || Kingsnake || J. V. McClusky || — || align=right | 4.9 km || 
|-id=383 bgcolor=#d6d6d6
| 179383 ||  || — || December 17, 2001 || Socorro || LINEAR || — || align=right | 5.0 km || 
|-id=384 bgcolor=#d6d6d6
| 179384 ||  || — || December 17, 2001 || Socorro || LINEAR || THM || align=right | 2.9 km || 
|-id=385 bgcolor=#d6d6d6
| 179385 ||  || — || December 17, 2001 || Socorro || LINEAR || THM || align=right | 2.9 km || 
|-id=386 bgcolor=#d6d6d6
| 179386 ||  || — || December 18, 2001 || Socorro || LINEAR || — || align=right | 5.0 km || 
|-id=387 bgcolor=#E9E9E9
| 179387 ||  || — || December 18, 2001 || Socorro || LINEAR || AGN || align=right | 1.8 km || 
|-id=388 bgcolor=#d6d6d6
| 179388 ||  || — || December 18, 2001 || Socorro || LINEAR || — || align=right | 3.1 km || 
|-id=389 bgcolor=#d6d6d6
| 179389 ||  || — || December 18, 2001 || Socorro || LINEAR || — || align=right | 3.8 km || 
|-id=390 bgcolor=#d6d6d6
| 179390 ||  || — || December 18, 2001 || Socorro || LINEAR || — || align=right | 5.9 km || 
|-id=391 bgcolor=#d6d6d6
| 179391 ||  || — || December 17, 2001 || Socorro || LINEAR || — || align=right | 3.6 km || 
|-id=392 bgcolor=#d6d6d6
| 179392 ||  || — || December 18, 2001 || Socorro || LINEAR || — || align=right | 3.6 km || 
|-id=393 bgcolor=#d6d6d6
| 179393 ||  || — || December 18, 2001 || Socorro || LINEAR || — || align=right | 4.5 km || 
|-id=394 bgcolor=#d6d6d6
| 179394 ||  || — || December 19, 2001 || Palomar || NEAT || — || align=right | 5.1 km || 
|-id=395 bgcolor=#d6d6d6
| 179395 ||  || — || December 17, 2001 || Socorro || LINEAR || EOS || align=right | 6.6 km || 
|-id=396 bgcolor=#d6d6d6
| 179396 ||  || — || December 17, 2001 || Socorro || LINEAR || — || align=right | 4.1 km || 
|-id=397 bgcolor=#d6d6d6
| 179397 ||  || — || December 18, 2001 || Socorro || LINEAR || — || align=right | 6.4 km || 
|-id=398 bgcolor=#d6d6d6
| 179398 ||  || — || December 17, 2001 || Socorro || LINEAR || EOS || align=right | 3.1 km || 
|-id=399 bgcolor=#d6d6d6
| 179399 ||  || — || December 17, 2001 || Socorro || LINEAR || — || align=right | 4.1 km || 
|-id=400 bgcolor=#d6d6d6
| 179400 ||  || — || December 18, 2001 || Socorro || LINEAR || — || align=right | 4.6 km || 
|}

179401–179500 

|-bgcolor=#d6d6d6
| 179401 ||  || — || December 22, 2001 || Kitt Peak || Spacewatch || — || align=right | 5.0 km || 
|-id=402 bgcolor=#d6d6d6
| 179402 ||  || — || December 20, 2001 || Socorro || LINEAR || — || align=right | 3.4 km || 
|-id=403 bgcolor=#d6d6d6
| 179403 ||  || — || December 22, 2001 || Socorro || LINEAR || — || align=right | 4.8 km || 
|-id=404 bgcolor=#d6d6d6
| 179404 ||  || — || December 17, 2001 || Kitt Peak || Spacewatch || KOR || align=right | 1.7 km || 
|-id=405 bgcolor=#d6d6d6
| 179405 ||  || — || December 17, 2001 || Socorro || LINEAR || — || align=right | 3.6 km || 
|-id=406 bgcolor=#d6d6d6
| 179406 ||  || — || December 19, 2001 || Palomar || NEAT || — || align=right | 6.1 km || 
|-id=407 bgcolor=#E9E9E9
| 179407 ||  || — || December 19, 2001 || Socorro || LINEAR || PAD || align=right | 3.7 km || 
|-id=408 bgcolor=#d6d6d6
| 179408 ||  || — || December 19, 2001 || Anderson Mesa || LONEOS || URS || align=right | 6.5 km || 
|-id=409 bgcolor=#d6d6d6
| 179409 ||  || — || December 20, 2001 || Palomar || NEAT || TIR || align=right | 4.5 km || 
|-id=410 bgcolor=#d6d6d6
| 179410 ||  || — || December 20, 2001 || Palomar || NEAT || — || align=right | 7.2 km || 
|-id=411 bgcolor=#d6d6d6
| 179411 Draganroša ||  ||  || December 18, 2001 || Apache Point || SDSS || HYG || align=right | 4.9 km || 
|-id=412 bgcolor=#d6d6d6
| 179412 ||  || — || December 18, 2001 || Palomar || NEAT || — || align=right | 3.6 km || 
|-id=413 bgcolor=#d6d6d6
| 179413 Stevekahn ||  ||  || December 19, 2001 || Apache Point || SDSS || — || align=right | 5.8 km || 
|-id=414 bgcolor=#fefefe
| 179414 ||  || — || January 7, 2002 || Socorro || LINEAR || H || align=right | 1.2 km || 
|-id=415 bgcolor=#d6d6d6
| 179415 ||  || — || January 10, 2002 || Campo Imperatore || CINEOS || — || align=right | 3.1 km || 
|-id=416 bgcolor=#d6d6d6
| 179416 ||  || — || January 9, 2002 || Črni Vrh || Črni Vrh || — || align=right | 4.2 km || 
|-id=417 bgcolor=#fefefe
| 179417 ||  || — || January 9, 2002 || Socorro || LINEAR || — || align=right | 1.0 km || 
|-id=418 bgcolor=#d6d6d6
| 179418 ||  || — || January 8, 2002 || Socorro || LINEAR || — || align=right | 5.4 km || 
|-id=419 bgcolor=#d6d6d6
| 179419 ||  || — || January 9, 2002 || Socorro || LINEAR || — || align=right | 4.4 km || 
|-id=420 bgcolor=#d6d6d6
| 179420 ||  || — || January 9, 2002 || Socorro || LINEAR || EOS || align=right | 3.0 km || 
|-id=421 bgcolor=#d6d6d6
| 179421 ||  || — || January 9, 2002 || Socorro || LINEAR || HYG || align=right | 4.4 km || 
|-id=422 bgcolor=#d6d6d6
| 179422 ||  || — || January 9, 2002 || Socorro || LINEAR || — || align=right | 4.9 km || 
|-id=423 bgcolor=#d6d6d6
| 179423 ||  || — || January 9, 2002 || Socorro || LINEAR || — || align=right | 3.7 km || 
|-id=424 bgcolor=#d6d6d6
| 179424 ||  || — || January 9, 2002 || Socorro || LINEAR || — || align=right | 6.2 km || 
|-id=425 bgcolor=#d6d6d6
| 179425 ||  || — || January 9, 2002 || Socorro || LINEAR || THM || align=right | 2.8 km || 
|-id=426 bgcolor=#d6d6d6
| 179426 ||  || — || January 9, 2002 || Socorro || LINEAR || — || align=right | 3.8 km || 
|-id=427 bgcolor=#d6d6d6
| 179427 ||  || — || January 9, 2002 || Socorro || LINEAR || HYG || align=right | 3.8 km || 
|-id=428 bgcolor=#d6d6d6
| 179428 ||  || — || January 9, 2002 || Socorro || LINEAR || EOS || align=right | 3.9 km || 
|-id=429 bgcolor=#d6d6d6
| 179429 ||  || — || January 11, 2002 || Socorro || LINEAR || — || align=right | 6.2 km || 
|-id=430 bgcolor=#d6d6d6
| 179430 ||  || — || January 12, 2002 || Socorro || LINEAR || — || align=right | 3.6 km || 
|-id=431 bgcolor=#d6d6d6
| 179431 ||  || — || January 8, 2002 || Socorro || LINEAR || THM || align=right | 2.6 km || 
|-id=432 bgcolor=#d6d6d6
| 179432 ||  || — || January 8, 2002 || Socorro || LINEAR || EOS || align=right | 2.9 km || 
|-id=433 bgcolor=#d6d6d6
| 179433 ||  || — || January 8, 2002 || Socorro || LINEAR || EOS || align=right | 2.9 km || 
|-id=434 bgcolor=#d6d6d6
| 179434 ||  || — || January 8, 2002 || Socorro || LINEAR || — || align=right | 3.2 km || 
|-id=435 bgcolor=#d6d6d6
| 179435 ||  || — || January 9, 2002 || Socorro || LINEAR || — || align=right | 5.4 km || 
|-id=436 bgcolor=#d6d6d6
| 179436 ||  || — || January 9, 2002 || Socorro || LINEAR || — || align=right | 5.1 km || 
|-id=437 bgcolor=#d6d6d6
| 179437 ||  || — || January 9, 2002 || Socorro || LINEAR || — || align=right | 5.1 km || 
|-id=438 bgcolor=#d6d6d6
| 179438 ||  || — || January 9, 2002 || Socorro || LINEAR || — || align=right | 5.0 km || 
|-id=439 bgcolor=#d6d6d6
| 179439 ||  || — || January 8, 2002 || Socorro || LINEAR || — || align=right | 4.0 km || 
|-id=440 bgcolor=#d6d6d6
| 179440 ||  || — || January 9, 2002 || Socorro || LINEAR || — || align=right | 3.7 km || 
|-id=441 bgcolor=#d6d6d6
| 179441 ||  || — || January 9, 2002 || Socorro || LINEAR || — || align=right | 4.5 km || 
|-id=442 bgcolor=#d6d6d6
| 179442 ||  || — || January 9, 2002 || Socorro || LINEAR || — || align=right | 6.7 km || 
|-id=443 bgcolor=#d6d6d6
| 179443 ||  || — || January 9, 2002 || Socorro || LINEAR || — || align=right | 5.1 km || 
|-id=444 bgcolor=#d6d6d6
| 179444 ||  || — || January 9, 2002 || Socorro || LINEAR || — || align=right | 3.3 km || 
|-id=445 bgcolor=#d6d6d6
| 179445 ||  || — || January 13, 2002 || Socorro || LINEAR || — || align=right | 3.7 km || 
|-id=446 bgcolor=#d6d6d6
| 179446 ||  || — || January 13, 2002 || Socorro || LINEAR || — || align=right | 6.4 km || 
|-id=447 bgcolor=#d6d6d6
| 179447 ||  || — || January 13, 2002 || Socorro || LINEAR || HYG || align=right | 4.0 km || 
|-id=448 bgcolor=#d6d6d6
| 179448 ||  || — || January 13, 2002 || Socorro || LINEAR || VER || align=right | 5.6 km || 
|-id=449 bgcolor=#d6d6d6
| 179449 ||  || — || January 13, 2002 || Socorro || LINEAR || — || align=right | 6.5 km || 
|-id=450 bgcolor=#d6d6d6
| 179450 ||  || — || January 14, 2002 || Socorro || LINEAR || EOS || align=right | 3.1 km || 
|-id=451 bgcolor=#d6d6d6
| 179451 ||  || — || January 14, 2002 || Socorro || LINEAR || — || align=right | 3.3 km || 
|-id=452 bgcolor=#d6d6d6
| 179452 ||  || — || January 14, 2002 || Socorro || LINEAR || — || align=right | 4.5 km || 
|-id=453 bgcolor=#d6d6d6
| 179453 ||  || — || January 14, 2002 || Socorro || LINEAR || HYG || align=right | 4.3 km || 
|-id=454 bgcolor=#d6d6d6
| 179454 ||  || — || January 14, 2002 || Socorro || LINEAR || HYG || align=right | 3.5 km || 
|-id=455 bgcolor=#d6d6d6
| 179455 ||  || — || January 14, 2002 || Socorro || LINEAR || THM || align=right | 3.3 km || 
|-id=456 bgcolor=#d6d6d6
| 179456 ||  || — || January 14, 2002 || Socorro || LINEAR || EOS || align=right | 3.7 km || 
|-id=457 bgcolor=#d6d6d6
| 179457 ||  || — || January 14, 2002 || Socorro || LINEAR || VER || align=right | 4.1 km || 
|-id=458 bgcolor=#d6d6d6
| 179458 ||  || — || January 14, 2002 || Socorro || LINEAR || — || align=right | 3.8 km || 
|-id=459 bgcolor=#d6d6d6
| 179459 ||  || — || January 10, 2002 || Palomar || NEAT || — || align=right | 4.3 km || 
|-id=460 bgcolor=#d6d6d6
| 179460 ||  || — || January 11, 2002 || Anderson Mesa || LONEOS || — || align=right | 3.6 km || 
|-id=461 bgcolor=#d6d6d6
| 179461 ||  || — || January 8, 2002 || Socorro || LINEAR || — || align=right | 4.8 km || 
|-id=462 bgcolor=#d6d6d6
| 179462 ||  || — || January 12, 2002 || Socorro || LINEAR || URS || align=right | 7.4 km || 
|-id=463 bgcolor=#d6d6d6
| 179463 ||  || — || January 9, 2002 || Nashville || R. Clingan || — || align=right | 4.6 km || 
|-id=464 bgcolor=#d6d6d6
| 179464 ||  || — || January 19, 2002 || Desert Eagle || W. K. Y. Yeung || HYG || align=right | 4.3 km || 
|-id=465 bgcolor=#d6d6d6
| 179465 ||  || — || January 18, 2002 || Anderson Mesa || LONEOS || — || align=right | 6.2 km || 
|-id=466 bgcolor=#d6d6d6
| 179466 ||  || — || January 19, 2002 || Anderson Mesa || LONEOS || ALA || align=right | 4.8 km || 
|-id=467 bgcolor=#d6d6d6
| 179467 ||  || — || January 18, 2002 || Socorro || LINEAR || — || align=right | 4.4 km || 
|-id=468 bgcolor=#d6d6d6
| 179468 ||  || — || January 19, 2002 || Socorro || LINEAR || MEL || align=right | 4.3 km || 
|-id=469 bgcolor=#d6d6d6
| 179469 ||  || — || January 22, 2002 || Socorro || LINEAR || — || align=right | 4.5 km || 
|-id=470 bgcolor=#d6d6d6
| 179470 ||  || — || January 23, 2002 || Socorro || LINEAR || — || align=right | 3.7 km || 
|-id=471 bgcolor=#d6d6d6
| 179471 ||  || — || January 23, 2002 || Socorro || LINEAR || — || align=right | 5.3 km || 
|-id=472 bgcolor=#d6d6d6
| 179472 ||  || — || January 23, 2002 || Socorro || LINEAR || HYG || align=right | 5.0 km || 
|-id=473 bgcolor=#d6d6d6
| 179473 ||  || — || January 17, 2002 || Palomar || NEAT || — || align=right | 4.3 km || 
|-id=474 bgcolor=#d6d6d6
| 179474 ||  || — || January 20, 2002 || Anderson Mesa || LONEOS || LIX || align=right | 6.2 km || 
|-id=475 bgcolor=#d6d6d6
| 179475 ||  || — || January 21, 2002 || Anderson Mesa || LONEOS || EOS || align=right | 3.1 km || 
|-id=476 bgcolor=#d6d6d6
| 179476 ||  || — || January 21, 2002 || Anderson Mesa || LONEOS || TIR || align=right | 5.0 km || 
|-id=477 bgcolor=#d6d6d6
| 179477 ||  || — || January 21, 2002 || Anderson Mesa || LONEOS || EUP || align=right | 7.1 km || 
|-id=478 bgcolor=#d6d6d6
| 179478 ||  || — || January 21, 2002 || Anderson Mesa || LONEOS || EUP || align=right | 7.5 km || 
|-id=479 bgcolor=#d6d6d6
| 179479 ||  || — || February 3, 2002 || Palomar || NEAT || HYG || align=right | 4.2 km || 
|-id=480 bgcolor=#d6d6d6
| 179480 ||  || — || February 3, 2002 || Palomar || NEAT || HYG || align=right | 5.2 km || 
|-id=481 bgcolor=#d6d6d6
| 179481 ||  || — || February 8, 2002 || Desert Eagle || W. K. Y. Yeung || — || align=right | 5.7 km || 
|-id=482 bgcolor=#d6d6d6
| 179482 ||  || — || February 6, 2002 || Socorro || LINEAR || — || align=right | 5.4 km || 
|-id=483 bgcolor=#d6d6d6
| 179483 ||  || — || February 6, 2002 || Socorro || LINEAR || HYG || align=right | 4.3 km || 
|-id=484 bgcolor=#d6d6d6
| 179484 ||  || — || February 6, 2002 || Socorro || LINEAR || — || align=right | 6.9 km || 
|-id=485 bgcolor=#d6d6d6
| 179485 ||  || — || February 5, 2002 || Palomar || NEAT || — || align=right | 7.2 km || 
|-id=486 bgcolor=#d6d6d6
| 179486 ||  || — || February 6, 2002 || Palomar || NEAT || — || align=right | 4.5 km || 
|-id=487 bgcolor=#d6d6d6
| 179487 ||  || — || February 6, 2002 || Socorro || LINEAR || TIR || align=right | 6.1 km || 
|-id=488 bgcolor=#d6d6d6
| 179488 ||  || — || February 6, 2002 || Socorro || LINEAR || — || align=right | 5.3 km || 
|-id=489 bgcolor=#d6d6d6
| 179489 ||  || — || February 6, 2002 || Socorro || LINEAR || EOS || align=right | 4.4 km || 
|-id=490 bgcolor=#d6d6d6
| 179490 ||  || — || February 7, 2002 || Socorro || LINEAR || HYG || align=right | 4.9 km || 
|-id=491 bgcolor=#d6d6d6
| 179491 ||  || — || February 7, 2002 || Palomar || NEAT || — || align=right | 6.1 km || 
|-id=492 bgcolor=#d6d6d6
| 179492 ||  || — || February 3, 2002 || Haleakala || NEAT || THB || align=right | 4.1 km || 
|-id=493 bgcolor=#d6d6d6
| 179493 ||  || — || February 6, 2002 || Socorro || LINEAR || URS || align=right | 5.7 km || 
|-id=494 bgcolor=#d6d6d6
| 179494 ||  || — || February 6, 2002 || Socorro || LINEAR || URS || align=right | 5.9 km || 
|-id=495 bgcolor=#d6d6d6
| 179495 ||  || — || February 6, 2002 || Socorro || LINEAR || EOS || align=right | 3.8 km || 
|-id=496 bgcolor=#d6d6d6
| 179496 ||  || — || February 7, 2002 || Socorro || LINEAR || — || align=right | 4.2 km || 
|-id=497 bgcolor=#d6d6d6
| 179497 ||  || — || February 7, 2002 || Socorro || LINEAR || — || align=right | 5.4 km || 
|-id=498 bgcolor=#d6d6d6
| 179498 ||  || — || February 7, 2002 || Socorro || LINEAR || THM || align=right | 3.1 km || 
|-id=499 bgcolor=#d6d6d6
| 179499 ||  || — || February 7, 2002 || Socorro || LINEAR || HYG || align=right | 4.6 km || 
|-id=500 bgcolor=#d6d6d6
| 179500 ||  || — || February 7, 2002 || Socorro || LINEAR || — || align=right | 5.3 km || 
|}

179501–179600 

|-bgcolor=#d6d6d6
| 179501 ||  || — || February 7, 2002 || Socorro || LINEAR || — || align=right | 4.2 km || 
|-id=502 bgcolor=#d6d6d6
| 179502 ||  || — || February 7, 2002 || Socorro || LINEAR || EOS || align=right | 3.8 km || 
|-id=503 bgcolor=#d6d6d6
| 179503 ||  || — || February 7, 2002 || Socorro || LINEAR || — || align=right | 7.4 km || 
|-id=504 bgcolor=#d6d6d6
| 179504 ||  || — || February 14, 2002 || Desert Eagle || W. K. Y. Yeung || HYG || align=right | 6.5 km || 
|-id=505 bgcolor=#d6d6d6
| 179505 ||  || — || February 7, 2002 || Socorro || LINEAR || — || align=right | 6.6 km || 
|-id=506 bgcolor=#d6d6d6
| 179506 ||  || — || February 7, 2002 || Socorro || LINEAR || — || align=right | 4.8 km || 
|-id=507 bgcolor=#d6d6d6
| 179507 ||  || — || February 7, 2002 || Socorro || LINEAR || LIX || align=right | 6.2 km || 
|-id=508 bgcolor=#d6d6d6
| 179508 ||  || — || February 8, 2002 || Socorro || LINEAR || — || align=right | 5.4 km || 
|-id=509 bgcolor=#d6d6d6
| 179509 ||  || — || February 8, 2002 || Socorro || LINEAR || — || align=right | 5.1 km || 
|-id=510 bgcolor=#d6d6d6
| 179510 ||  || — || February 8, 2002 || Socorro || LINEAR || — || align=right | 5.2 km || 
|-id=511 bgcolor=#d6d6d6
| 179511 ||  || — || February 9, 2002 || Socorro || LINEAR || — || align=right | 3.5 km || 
|-id=512 bgcolor=#d6d6d6
| 179512 ||  || — || February 9, 2002 || Socorro || LINEAR || — || align=right | 3.3 km || 
|-id=513 bgcolor=#d6d6d6
| 179513 ||  || — || February 6, 2002 || Socorro || LINEAR || EUP || align=right | 4.1 km || 
|-id=514 bgcolor=#d6d6d6
| 179514 ||  || — || February 6, 2002 || Socorro || LINEAR || — || align=right | 7.0 km || 
|-id=515 bgcolor=#d6d6d6
| 179515 ||  || — || February 7, 2002 || Socorro || LINEAR || — || align=right | 3.3 km || 
|-id=516 bgcolor=#d6d6d6
| 179516 ||  || — || February 7, 2002 || Socorro || LINEAR || — || align=right | 5.0 km || 
|-id=517 bgcolor=#d6d6d6
| 179517 ||  || — || February 7, 2002 || Socorro || LINEAR || VER || align=right | 5.0 km || 
|-id=518 bgcolor=#d6d6d6
| 179518 ||  || — || February 8, 2002 || Socorro || LINEAR || — || align=right | 4.7 km || 
|-id=519 bgcolor=#d6d6d6
| 179519 ||  || — || February 8, 2002 || Socorro || LINEAR || — || align=right | 4.7 km || 
|-id=520 bgcolor=#d6d6d6
| 179520 ||  || — || February 8, 2002 || Socorro || LINEAR || LIX || align=right | 6.1 km || 
|-id=521 bgcolor=#d6d6d6
| 179521 ||  || — || February 8, 2002 || Socorro || LINEAR || EOS || align=right | 3.4 km || 
|-id=522 bgcolor=#d6d6d6
| 179522 ||  || — || February 8, 2002 || Socorro || LINEAR || — || align=right | 5.4 km || 
|-id=523 bgcolor=#d6d6d6
| 179523 ||  || — || February 8, 2002 || Socorro || LINEAR || — || align=right | 6.9 km || 
|-id=524 bgcolor=#d6d6d6
| 179524 ||  || — || February 8, 2002 || Socorro || LINEAR || LUT || align=right | 8.3 km || 
|-id=525 bgcolor=#d6d6d6
| 179525 ||  || — || February 10, 2002 || Socorro || LINEAR || EUP || align=right | 7.1 km || 
|-id=526 bgcolor=#d6d6d6
| 179526 ||  || — || February 10, 2002 || Socorro || LINEAR || — || align=right | 4.3 km || 
|-id=527 bgcolor=#d6d6d6
| 179527 ||  || — || February 10, 2002 || Socorro || LINEAR || THM || align=right | 2.4 km || 
|-id=528 bgcolor=#d6d6d6
| 179528 ||  || — || February 10, 2002 || Socorro || LINEAR || THM || align=right | 2.8 km || 
|-id=529 bgcolor=#d6d6d6
| 179529 ||  || — || February 10, 2002 || Socorro || LINEAR || — || align=right | 5.3 km || 
|-id=530 bgcolor=#d6d6d6
| 179530 ||  || — || February 10, 2002 || Socorro || LINEAR || — || align=right | 6.2 km || 
|-id=531 bgcolor=#d6d6d6
| 179531 ||  || — || February 10, 2002 || Socorro || LINEAR || HYG || align=right | 3.5 km || 
|-id=532 bgcolor=#d6d6d6
| 179532 ||  || — || February 10, 2002 || Socorro || LINEAR || — || align=right | 4.0 km || 
|-id=533 bgcolor=#d6d6d6
| 179533 ||  || — || February 10, 2002 || Socorro || LINEAR || — || align=right | 5.9 km || 
|-id=534 bgcolor=#d6d6d6
| 179534 ||  || — || February 10, 2002 || Socorro || LINEAR || — || align=right | 5.8 km || 
|-id=535 bgcolor=#d6d6d6
| 179535 ||  || — || February 10, 2002 || Socorro || LINEAR || THM || align=right | 3.6 km || 
|-id=536 bgcolor=#d6d6d6
| 179536 ||  || — || February 14, 2002 || Bergisch Gladbach || W. Bickel || EUP || align=right | 6.4 km || 
|-id=537 bgcolor=#d6d6d6
| 179537 ||  || — || February 9, 2002 || Kitt Peak || Spacewatch || THM || align=right | 3.3 km || 
|-id=538 bgcolor=#d6d6d6
| 179538 ||  || — || February 11, 2002 || Socorro || LINEAR || 7:4 || align=right | 6.2 km || 
|-id=539 bgcolor=#d6d6d6
| 179539 ||  || — || February 11, 2002 || Socorro || LINEAR || — || align=right | 4.6 km || 
|-id=540 bgcolor=#d6d6d6
| 179540 ||  || — || February 4, 2002 || Cima Ekar || ADAS || — || align=right | 4.5 km || 
|-id=541 bgcolor=#d6d6d6
| 179541 ||  || — || February 7, 2002 || Palomar || NEAT || — || align=right | 4.3 km || 
|-id=542 bgcolor=#d6d6d6
| 179542 ||  || — || February 6, 2002 || Socorro || LINEAR || TIR || align=right | 5.9 km || 
|-id=543 bgcolor=#d6d6d6
| 179543 ||  || — || February 6, 2002 || Palomar || NEAT || URS || align=right | 5.4 km || 
|-id=544 bgcolor=#d6d6d6
| 179544 ||  || — || February 11, 2002 || Socorro || LINEAR || — || align=right | 3.8 km || 
|-id=545 bgcolor=#d6d6d6
| 179545 ||  || — || February 10, 2002 || Socorro || LINEAR || — || align=right | 4.1 km || 
|-id=546 bgcolor=#d6d6d6
| 179546 ||  || — || February 10, 2002 || Socorro || LINEAR || — || align=right | 3.6 km || 
|-id=547 bgcolor=#d6d6d6
| 179547 ||  || — || February 10, 2002 || Socorro || LINEAR || — || align=right | 4.5 km || 
|-id=548 bgcolor=#d6d6d6
| 179548 ||  || — || February 10, 2002 || Socorro || LINEAR || — || align=right | 7.3 km || 
|-id=549 bgcolor=#d6d6d6
| 179549 ||  || — || February 10, 2002 || Socorro || LINEAR || — || align=right | 3.9 km || 
|-id=550 bgcolor=#d6d6d6
| 179550 ||  || — || February 12, 2002 || Socorro || LINEAR || — || align=right | 4.8 km || 
|-id=551 bgcolor=#d6d6d6
| 179551 ||  || — || February 11, 2002 || Socorro || LINEAR || — || align=right | 4.7 km || 
|-id=552 bgcolor=#d6d6d6
| 179552 ||  || — || February 8, 2002 || Haleakala || NEAT || — || align=right | 3.8 km || 
|-id=553 bgcolor=#d6d6d6
| 179553 || 2002 DJ || — || February 16, 2002 || Bohyunsan || Y.-B. Jeon, B.-C. Lee || THM || align=right | 4.5 km || 
|-id=554 bgcolor=#d6d6d6
| 179554 ||  || — || February 19, 2002 || Socorro || LINEAR || EUP || align=right | 7.6 km || 
|-id=555 bgcolor=#d6d6d6
| 179555 ||  || — || February 16, 2002 || Palomar || NEAT || — || align=right | 3.7 km || 
|-id=556 bgcolor=#d6d6d6
| 179556 ||  || — || February 20, 2002 || Kitt Peak || Spacewatch || — || align=right | 4.5 km || 
|-id=557 bgcolor=#d6d6d6
| 179557 ||  || — || February 19, 2002 || Socorro || LINEAR || — || align=right | 5.6 km || 
|-id=558 bgcolor=#d6d6d6
| 179558 ||  || — || February 19, 2002 || Socorro || LINEAR || TIR || align=right | 4.8 km || 
|-id=559 bgcolor=#d6d6d6
| 179559 ||  || — || February 28, 2002 || Palomar || NEAT || — || align=right | 5.6 km || 
|-id=560 bgcolor=#d6d6d6
| 179560 ||  || — || March 13, 2002 || Kleť || Kleť Obs. || — || align=right | 3.7 km || 
|-id=561 bgcolor=#d6d6d6
| 179561 ||  || — || March 5, 2002 || Kitt Peak || Spacewatch || THM || align=right | 4.1 km || 
|-id=562 bgcolor=#d6d6d6
| 179562 ||  || — || March 9, 2002 || Socorro || LINEAR || — || align=right | 4.8 km || 
|-id=563 bgcolor=#fefefe
| 179563 ||  || — || March 12, 2002 || Palomar || NEAT || V || align=right | 1.1 km || 
|-id=564 bgcolor=#d6d6d6
| 179564 ||  || — || March 13, 2002 || Socorro || LINEAR || — || align=right | 5.6 km || 
|-id=565 bgcolor=#fefefe
| 179565 ||  || — || March 13, 2002 || Socorro || LINEAR || — || align=right | 1.5 km || 
|-id=566 bgcolor=#d6d6d6
| 179566 ||  || — || March 13, 2002 || Socorro || LINEAR || — || align=right | 6.0 km || 
|-id=567 bgcolor=#d6d6d6
| 179567 ||  || — || March 13, 2002 || Palomar || NEAT || — || align=right | 4.7 km || 
|-id=568 bgcolor=#d6d6d6
| 179568 ||  || — || March 9, 2002 || Socorro || LINEAR || — || align=right | 4.4 km || 
|-id=569 bgcolor=#d6d6d6
| 179569 ||  || — || March 14, 2002 || Socorro || LINEAR || — || align=right | 3.6 km || 
|-id=570 bgcolor=#d6d6d6
| 179570 ||  || — || March 14, 2002 || Socorro || LINEAR || — || align=right | 4.0 km || 
|-id=571 bgcolor=#d6d6d6
| 179571 ||  || — || March 14, 2002 || Socorro || LINEAR || — || align=right | 5.5 km || 
|-id=572 bgcolor=#d6d6d6
| 179572 ||  || — || March 16, 2002 || Anderson Mesa || LONEOS || — || align=right | 6.6 km || 
|-id=573 bgcolor=#d6d6d6
| 179573 ||  || — || March 19, 2002 || Palomar || NEAT || — || align=right | 7.0 km || 
|-id=574 bgcolor=#d6d6d6
| 179574 ||  || — || March 19, 2002 || Palomar || NEAT || — || align=right | 6.9 km || 
|-id=575 bgcolor=#d6d6d6
| 179575 ||  || — || March 20, 2002 || Palomar || NEAT || — || align=right | 5.1 km || 
|-id=576 bgcolor=#fefefe
| 179576 ||  || — || April 10, 2002 || Socorro || LINEAR || — || align=right | 1.0 km || 
|-id=577 bgcolor=#d6d6d6
| 179577 ||  || — || April 14, 2002 || Socorro || LINEAR || HYG || align=right | 5.6 km || 
|-id=578 bgcolor=#d6d6d6
| 179578 ||  || — || April 15, 2002 || Socorro || LINEAR || ALA || align=right | 8.0 km || 
|-id=579 bgcolor=#fefefe
| 179579 ||  || — || April 5, 2002 || Palomar || NEAT || V || align=right | 1.2 km || 
|-id=580 bgcolor=#d6d6d6
| 179580 ||  || — || April 12, 2002 || Socorro || LINEAR || — || align=right | 4.3 km || 
|-id=581 bgcolor=#d6d6d6
| 179581 || 2002 HZ || — || April 16, 2002 || Socorro || LINEAR || — || align=right | 7.2 km || 
|-id=582 bgcolor=#d6d6d6
| 179582 ||  || — || May 4, 2002 || Socorro || LINEAR || EUP || align=right | 7.5 km || 
|-id=583 bgcolor=#fefefe
| 179583 ||  || — || May 8, 2002 || Haleakala || NEAT || — || align=right data-sort-value="0.94" | 940 m || 
|-id=584 bgcolor=#fefefe
| 179584 ||  || — || May 11, 2002 || Socorro || LINEAR || — || align=right | 1.4 km || 
|-id=585 bgcolor=#fefefe
| 179585 ||  || — || May 11, 2002 || Socorro || LINEAR || — || align=right | 2.0 km || 
|-id=586 bgcolor=#FA8072
| 179586 ||  || — || May 18, 2002 || Palomar || NEAT || — || align=right | 1.1 km || 
|-id=587 bgcolor=#FA8072
| 179587 ||  || — || June 5, 2002 || Anderson Mesa || LONEOS || — || align=right | 1.2 km || 
|-id=588 bgcolor=#fefefe
| 179588 ||  || — || June 5, 2002 || Socorro || LINEAR || — || align=right | 1.3 km || 
|-id=589 bgcolor=#fefefe
| 179589 ||  || — || June 2, 2002 || Palomar || NEAT || — || align=right | 1.0 km || 
|-id=590 bgcolor=#fefefe
| 179590 ||  || — || June 3, 2002 || Palomar || NEAT || — || align=right | 1.1 km || 
|-id=591 bgcolor=#fefefe
| 179591 ||  || — || June 9, 2002 || Socorro || LINEAR || FLO || align=right | 1.0 km || 
|-id=592 bgcolor=#fefefe
| 179592 ||  || — || June 10, 2002 || Socorro || LINEAR || FLO || align=right data-sort-value="0.91" | 910 m || 
|-id=593 bgcolor=#fefefe
| 179593 Penglangxiaoxue ||  ||  || June 1, 2002 || Palomar || NEAT || — || align=right | 1.2 km || 
|-id=594 bgcolor=#fefefe
| 179594 ||  || — || June 17, 2002 || Palomar || NEAT || — || align=right | 1.4 km || 
|-id=595 bgcolor=#fefefe
| 179595 Belkovich ||  ||  || June 22, 2002 || La Palma || A. Fitzsimmons, I. P. Williams || FLO || align=right data-sort-value="0.72" | 720 m || 
|-id=596 bgcolor=#FA8072
| 179596 ||  || — || July 13, 2002 || Haleakala || NEAT || — || align=right | 1.2 km || 
|-id=597 bgcolor=#fefefe
| 179597 ||  || — || July 9, 2002 || Socorro || LINEAR || V || align=right | 1.1 km || 
|-id=598 bgcolor=#fefefe
| 179598 ||  || — || July 9, 2002 || Socorro || LINEAR || V || align=right data-sort-value="0.91" | 910 m || 
|-id=599 bgcolor=#fefefe
| 179599 ||  || — || July 9, 2002 || Socorro || LINEAR || FLO || align=right data-sort-value="0.98" | 980 m || 
|-id=600 bgcolor=#fefefe
| 179600 ||  || — || July 13, 2002 || Haleakala || NEAT || — || align=right | 1.4 km || 
|}

179601–179700 

|-bgcolor=#fefefe
| 179601 ||  || — || July 9, 2002 || Socorro || LINEAR || FLO || align=right data-sort-value="0.72" | 720 m || 
|-id=602 bgcolor=#fefefe
| 179602 ||  || — || July 15, 2002 || Palomar || NEAT || — || align=right | 1.4 km || 
|-id=603 bgcolor=#E9E9E9
| 179603 ||  || — || July 13, 2002 || Palomar || NEAT || — || align=right | 2.2 km || 
|-id=604 bgcolor=#fefefe
| 179604 ||  || — || July 14, 2002 || Socorro || LINEAR || V || align=right data-sort-value="0.91" | 910 m || 
|-id=605 bgcolor=#fefefe
| 179605 ||  || — || July 12, 2002 || Palomar || NEAT || — || align=right | 1.0 km || 
|-id=606 bgcolor=#fefefe
| 179606 ||  || — || July 12, 2002 || Palomar || NEAT || V || align=right data-sort-value="0.90" | 900 m || 
|-id=607 bgcolor=#fefefe
| 179607 ||  || — || July 20, 2002 || Palomar || NEAT || — || align=right | 1.0 km || 
|-id=608 bgcolor=#fefefe
| 179608 ||  || — || July 22, 2002 || Palomar || NEAT || — || align=right | 1.3 km || 
|-id=609 bgcolor=#fefefe
| 179609 ||  || — || July 18, 2002 || Socorro || LINEAR || FLO || align=right | 1.1 km || 
|-id=610 bgcolor=#fefefe
| 179610 ||  || — || July 17, 2002 || Palomar || NEAT || FLO || align=right data-sort-value="0.74" | 740 m || 
|-id=611 bgcolor=#E9E9E9
| 179611 ||  || — || July 30, 2002 || Haleakala || NEAT || — || align=right | 3.7 km || 
|-id=612 bgcolor=#fefefe
| 179612 ||  || — || July 22, 2002 || Palomar || NEAT || NYS || align=right data-sort-value="0.74" | 740 m || 
|-id=613 bgcolor=#fefefe
| 179613 ||  || — || August 4, 2002 || Palomar || NEAT || — || align=right | 1.7 km || 
|-id=614 bgcolor=#fefefe
| 179614 ||  || — || August 5, 2002 || Palomar || NEAT || — || align=right | 1.2 km || 
|-id=615 bgcolor=#fefefe
| 179615 ||  || — || August 6, 2002 || Palomar || NEAT || NYS || align=right data-sort-value="0.84" | 840 m || 
|-id=616 bgcolor=#fefefe
| 179616 ||  || — || August 6, 2002 || Palomar || NEAT || — || align=right | 1.1 km || 
|-id=617 bgcolor=#E9E9E9
| 179617 ||  || — || August 6, 2002 || Palomar || NEAT || — || align=right | 1.7 km || 
|-id=618 bgcolor=#fefefe
| 179618 ||  || — || August 6, 2002 || Palomar || NEAT || MAS || align=right data-sort-value="0.95" | 950 m || 
|-id=619 bgcolor=#fefefe
| 179619 ||  || — || August 6, 2002 || Palomar || NEAT || NYS || align=right | 1.0 km || 
|-id=620 bgcolor=#fefefe
| 179620 ||  || — || August 6, 2002 || Campo Imperatore || CINEOS || — || align=right | 1.4 km || 
|-id=621 bgcolor=#fefefe
| 179621 ||  || — || August 8, 2002 || Eskridge || Farpoint Obs. || — || align=right | 1.2 km || 
|-id=622 bgcolor=#fefefe
| 179622 ||  || — || August 6, 2002 || Palomar || NEAT || NYS || align=right data-sort-value="0.77" | 770 m || 
|-id=623 bgcolor=#fefefe
| 179623 ||  || — || August 10, 2002 || Socorro || LINEAR || — || align=right | 1.3 km || 
|-id=624 bgcolor=#fefefe
| 179624 ||  || — || August 9, 2002 || Haleakala || NEAT || FLO || align=right data-sort-value="0.91" | 910 m || 
|-id=625 bgcolor=#fefefe
| 179625 ||  || — || August 9, 2002 || Socorro || LINEAR || FLO || align=right | 1.0 km || 
|-id=626 bgcolor=#fefefe
| 179626 ||  || — || August 9, 2002 || Socorro || LINEAR || — || align=right | 1.2 km || 
|-id=627 bgcolor=#fefefe
| 179627 ||  || — || August 9, 2002 || Socorro || LINEAR || — || align=right | 1.4 km || 
|-id=628 bgcolor=#fefefe
| 179628 ||  || — || August 10, 2002 || Socorro || LINEAR || — || align=right | 1.3 km || 
|-id=629 bgcolor=#fefefe
| 179629 ||  || — || August 10, 2002 || Socorro || LINEAR || PHO || align=right | 2.1 km || 
|-id=630 bgcolor=#FA8072
| 179630 ||  || — || August 11, 2002 || Socorro || LINEAR || — || align=right | 1.7 km || 
|-id=631 bgcolor=#fefefe
| 179631 ||  || — || August 12, 2002 || Socorro || LINEAR || V || align=right data-sort-value="0.88" | 880 m || 
|-id=632 bgcolor=#E9E9E9
| 179632 ||  || — || August 13, 2002 || Socorro || LINEAR || JUN || align=right | 4.7 km || 
|-id=633 bgcolor=#fefefe
| 179633 ||  || — || August 13, 2002 || Socorro || LINEAR || V || align=right | 1.1 km || 
|-id=634 bgcolor=#fefefe
| 179634 ||  || — || August 11, 2002 || Haleakala || NEAT || V || align=right data-sort-value="0.99" | 990 m || 
|-id=635 bgcolor=#fefefe
| 179635 ||  || — || August 14, 2002 || Socorro || LINEAR || V || align=right | 1.1 km || 
|-id=636 bgcolor=#fefefe
| 179636 ||  || — || August 14, 2002 || Palomar || NEAT || — || align=right | 1.7 km || 
|-id=637 bgcolor=#fefefe
| 179637 ||  || — || August 13, 2002 || Kitt Peak || Spacewatch || NYS || align=right data-sort-value="0.93" | 930 m || 
|-id=638 bgcolor=#fefefe
| 179638 ||  || — || August 14, 2002 || Anderson Mesa || LONEOS || FLO || align=right | 2.2 km || 
|-id=639 bgcolor=#E9E9E9
| 179639 ||  || — || August 13, 2002 || Anderson Mesa || LONEOS || — || align=right | 1.4 km || 
|-id=640 bgcolor=#fefefe
| 179640 ||  || — || August 13, 2002 || Anderson Mesa || LONEOS || V || align=right data-sort-value="0.97" | 970 m || 
|-id=641 bgcolor=#fefefe
| 179641 ||  || — || August 13, 2002 || Anderson Mesa || LONEOS || V || align=right | 1.1 km || 
|-id=642 bgcolor=#E9E9E9
| 179642 ||  || — || August 14, 2002 || Socorro || LINEAR || — || align=right | 4.3 km || 
|-id=643 bgcolor=#fefefe
| 179643 ||  || — || August 14, 2002 || Socorro || LINEAR || — || align=right data-sort-value="0.99" | 990 m || 
|-id=644 bgcolor=#fefefe
| 179644 ||  || — || August 14, 2002 || Socorro || LINEAR || NYS || align=right data-sort-value="0.98" | 980 m || 
|-id=645 bgcolor=#fefefe
| 179645 ||  || — || August 14, 2002 || Socorro || LINEAR || FLO || align=right data-sort-value="0.94" | 940 m || 
|-id=646 bgcolor=#fefefe
| 179646 ||  || — || August 14, 2002 || Socorro || LINEAR || — || align=right | 1.2 km || 
|-id=647 bgcolor=#fefefe
| 179647 Stuartrobbins ||  ||  || August 10, 2002 || Cerro Tololo || M. W. Buie || NYS || align=right data-sort-value="0.89" | 890 m || 
|-id=648 bgcolor=#fefefe
| 179648 ||  || — || August 8, 2002 || Palomar || S. F. Hönig || — || align=right data-sort-value="0.92" | 920 m || 
|-id=649 bgcolor=#E9E9E9
| 179649 ||  || — || August 8, 2002 || Palomar || S. F. Hönig || — || align=right | 1.3 km || 
|-id=650 bgcolor=#fefefe
| 179650 ||  || — || August 8, 2002 || Palomar || S. F. Hönig || — || align=right data-sort-value="0.80" | 800 m || 
|-id=651 bgcolor=#fefefe
| 179651 ||  || — || August 8, 2002 || Palomar || NEAT || — || align=right data-sort-value="0.96" | 960 m || 
|-id=652 bgcolor=#fefefe
| 179652 ||  || — || August 11, 2002 || Palomar || NEAT || NYS || align=right data-sort-value="0.89" | 890 m || 
|-id=653 bgcolor=#fefefe
| 179653 ||  || — || August 11, 2002 || Palomar || NEAT || — || align=right | 1.4 km || 
|-id=654 bgcolor=#E9E9E9
| 179654 ||  || — || August 11, 2002 || Palomar || NEAT || GEF || align=right | 1.8 km || 
|-id=655 bgcolor=#fefefe
| 179655 ||  || — || August 16, 2002 || Haleakala || NEAT || — || align=right | 1.3 km || 
|-id=656 bgcolor=#fefefe
| 179656 ||  || — || August 16, 2002 || Palomar || NEAT || V || align=right | 1.0 km || 
|-id=657 bgcolor=#fefefe
| 179657 ||  || — || August 26, 2002 || Palomar || NEAT || — || align=right | 1.6 km || 
|-id=658 bgcolor=#fefefe
| 179658 ||  || — || August 26, 2002 || Palomar || NEAT || — || align=right | 2.6 km || 
|-id=659 bgcolor=#E9E9E9
| 179659 ||  || — || August 28, 2002 || Palomar || NEAT || — || align=right | 1.2 km || 
|-id=660 bgcolor=#fefefe
| 179660 ||  || — || August 27, 2002 || Palomar || NEAT || — || align=right | 1.6 km || 
|-id=661 bgcolor=#fefefe
| 179661 ||  || — || August 28, 2002 || Palomar || NEAT || NYS || align=right data-sort-value="0.99" | 990 m || 
|-id=662 bgcolor=#fefefe
| 179662 ||  || — || August 28, 2002 || Palomar || NEAT || NYS || align=right data-sort-value="0.91" | 910 m || 
|-id=663 bgcolor=#fefefe
| 179663 ||  || — || August 29, 2002 || Palomar || NEAT || — || align=right | 1.1 km || 
|-id=664 bgcolor=#fefefe
| 179664 ||  || — || August 29, 2002 || Palomar || NEAT || V || align=right data-sort-value="0.89" | 890 m || 
|-id=665 bgcolor=#fefefe
| 179665 ||  || — || August 29, 2002 || Palomar || NEAT || NYS || align=right | 1.1 km || 
|-id=666 bgcolor=#E9E9E9
| 179666 ||  || — || August 29, 2002 || Palomar || NEAT || — || align=right data-sort-value="0.98" | 980 m || 
|-id=667 bgcolor=#fefefe
| 179667 ||  || — || August 29, 2002 || Palomar || NEAT || — || align=right | 1.2 km || 
|-id=668 bgcolor=#fefefe
| 179668 ||  || — || August 29, 2002 || Palomar || NEAT || — || align=right | 1.7 km || 
|-id=669 bgcolor=#fefefe
| 179669 ||  || — || August 29, 2002 || Palomar || NEAT || FLO || align=right | 1.0 km || 
|-id=670 bgcolor=#fefefe
| 179670 ||  || — || August 29, 2002 || Palomar || NEAT || V || align=right | 1.1 km || 
|-id=671 bgcolor=#E9E9E9
| 179671 ||  || — || August 30, 2002 || Anderson Mesa || LONEOS || — || align=right | 1.6 km || 
|-id=672 bgcolor=#fefefe
| 179672 ||  || — || August 20, 2002 || Palomar || R. Matson || V || align=right data-sort-value="0.91" | 910 m || 
|-id=673 bgcolor=#fefefe
| 179673 ||  || — || August 29, 2002 || Palomar || R. Matson || — || align=right | 1.0 km || 
|-id=674 bgcolor=#fefefe
| 179674 ||  || — || August 17, 2002 || Palomar || NEAT || — || align=right | 1.0 km || 
|-id=675 bgcolor=#fefefe
| 179675 ||  || — || August 17, 2002 || Palomar || NEAT || V || align=right | 1.0 km || 
|-id=676 bgcolor=#fefefe
| 179676 ||  || — || August 28, 2002 || Palomar || NEAT || MAS || align=right data-sort-value="0.80" | 800 m || 
|-id=677 bgcolor=#fefefe
| 179677 ||  || — || August 30, 2002 || Palomar || NEAT || NYS || align=right data-sort-value="0.93" | 930 m || 
|-id=678 bgcolor=#fefefe
| 179678 Rietmeijer ||  ||  || August 26, 2002 || Palomar || NEAT || — || align=right | 1.1 km || 
|-id=679 bgcolor=#fefefe
| 179679 ||  || — || August 28, 2002 || Palomar || NEAT || FLO || align=right | 1.0 km || 
|-id=680 bgcolor=#fefefe
| 179680 ||  || — || August 18, 2002 || Palomar || NEAT || — || align=right data-sort-value="0.84" | 840 m || 
|-id=681 bgcolor=#fefefe
| 179681 ||  || — || August 17, 2002 || Palomar || NEAT || — || align=right | 1.1 km || 
|-id=682 bgcolor=#fefefe
| 179682 ||  || — || August 16, 2002 || Nanchuan || Q.-z. Ye || V || align=right data-sort-value="0.96" | 960 m || 
|-id=683 bgcolor=#fefefe
| 179683 ||  || — || August 27, 2002 || Palomar || NEAT || V || align=right data-sort-value="0.68" | 680 m || 
|-id=684 bgcolor=#fefefe
| 179684 ||  || — || August 29, 2002 || Palomar || NEAT || — || align=right | 1.0 km || 
|-id=685 bgcolor=#fefefe
| 179685 ||  || — || August 18, 2002 || Palomar || NEAT || — || align=right data-sort-value="0.87" | 870 m || 
|-id=686 bgcolor=#fefefe
| 179686 ||  || — || August 17, 2002 || Palomar || NEAT || V || align=right data-sort-value="0.70" | 700 m || 
|-id=687 bgcolor=#fefefe
| 179687 ||  || — || August 29, 2002 || Palomar || NEAT || — || align=right data-sort-value="0.83" | 830 m || 
|-id=688 bgcolor=#fefefe
| 179688 ||  || — || August 30, 2002 || Palomar || NEAT || NYS || align=right | 1.1 km || 
|-id=689 bgcolor=#fefefe
| 179689 ||  || — || September 1, 2002 || Haleakala || NEAT || — || align=right | 1.5 km || 
|-id=690 bgcolor=#fefefe
| 179690 ||  || — || September 3, 2002 || Haleakala || NEAT || MAS || align=right | 1.4 km || 
|-id=691 bgcolor=#fefefe
| 179691 ||  || — || September 3, 2002 || Haleakala || NEAT || NYS || align=right | 1.1 km || 
|-id=692 bgcolor=#fefefe
| 179692 ||  || — || September 4, 2002 || Anderson Mesa || LONEOS || — || align=right | 1.1 km || 
|-id=693 bgcolor=#fefefe
| 179693 ||  || — || September 4, 2002 || Anderson Mesa || LONEOS || PHO || align=right | 1.9 km || 
|-id=694 bgcolor=#fefefe
| 179694 ||  || — || September 4, 2002 || Anderson Mesa || LONEOS || FLO || align=right | 1.2 km || 
|-id=695 bgcolor=#fefefe
| 179695 ||  || — || September 4, 2002 || Anderson Mesa || LONEOS || MAS || align=right | 1.3 km || 
|-id=696 bgcolor=#fefefe
| 179696 ||  || — || September 4, 2002 || Anderson Mesa || LONEOS || ERI || align=right | 2.7 km || 
|-id=697 bgcolor=#fefefe
| 179697 ||  || — || September 4, 2002 || Anderson Mesa || LONEOS || — || align=right data-sort-value="0.94" | 940 m || 
|-id=698 bgcolor=#fefefe
| 179698 ||  || — || September 4, 2002 || Anderson Mesa || LONEOS || — || align=right | 1.4 km || 
|-id=699 bgcolor=#E9E9E9
| 179699 ||  || — || September 5, 2002 || Socorro || LINEAR || — || align=right | 3.9 km || 
|-id=700 bgcolor=#fefefe
| 179700 ||  || — || September 3, 2002 || Haleakala || NEAT || FLO || align=right | 1.2 km || 
|}

179701–179800 

|-bgcolor=#fefefe
| 179701 ||  || — || September 4, 2002 || Anderson Mesa || LONEOS || — || align=right | 1.4 km || 
|-id=702 bgcolor=#fefefe
| 179702 ||  || — || September 4, 2002 || Anderson Mesa || LONEOS || — || align=right | 1.5 km || 
|-id=703 bgcolor=#fefefe
| 179703 ||  || — || September 5, 2002 || Socorro || LINEAR || NYS || align=right | 1.2 km || 
|-id=704 bgcolor=#fefefe
| 179704 ||  || — || September 5, 2002 || Socorro || LINEAR || FLO || align=right data-sort-value="0.94" | 940 m || 
|-id=705 bgcolor=#E9E9E9
| 179705 ||  || — || September 5, 2002 || Socorro || LINEAR || HEN || align=right | 2.0 km || 
|-id=706 bgcolor=#fefefe
| 179706 ||  || — || September 5, 2002 || Socorro || LINEAR || V || align=right data-sort-value="0.90" | 900 m || 
|-id=707 bgcolor=#fefefe
| 179707 ||  || — || September 5, 2002 || Socorro || LINEAR || — || align=right | 1.5 km || 
|-id=708 bgcolor=#fefefe
| 179708 ||  || — || September 5, 2002 || Socorro || LINEAR || — || align=right | 1.3 km || 
|-id=709 bgcolor=#fefefe
| 179709 ||  || — || September 5, 2002 || Socorro || LINEAR || NYS || align=right data-sort-value="0.92" | 920 m || 
|-id=710 bgcolor=#fefefe
| 179710 ||  || — || September 5, 2002 || Socorro || LINEAR || — || align=right | 1.3 km || 
|-id=711 bgcolor=#E9E9E9
| 179711 ||  || — || September 5, 2002 || Anderson Mesa || LONEOS || — || align=right | 1.4 km || 
|-id=712 bgcolor=#fefefe
| 179712 ||  || — || September 5, 2002 || Anderson Mesa || LONEOS || V || align=right data-sort-value="0.95" | 950 m || 
|-id=713 bgcolor=#fefefe
| 179713 ||  || — || September 5, 2002 || Anderson Mesa || LONEOS || — || align=right | 1.2 km || 
|-id=714 bgcolor=#fefefe
| 179714 ||  || — || September 5, 2002 || Socorro || LINEAR || — || align=right | 1.5 km || 
|-id=715 bgcolor=#fefefe
| 179715 ||  || — || September 5, 2002 || Socorro || LINEAR || — || align=right | 1.5 km || 
|-id=716 bgcolor=#fefefe
| 179716 ||  || — || September 5, 2002 || Socorro || LINEAR || — || align=right | 2.3 km || 
|-id=717 bgcolor=#fefefe
| 179717 ||  || — || September 5, 2002 || Socorro || LINEAR || NYS || align=right | 1.00 km || 
|-id=718 bgcolor=#fefefe
| 179718 ||  || — || September 3, 2002 || Palomar || NEAT || V || align=right | 1.4 km || 
|-id=719 bgcolor=#fefefe
| 179719 ||  || — || September 5, 2002 || Socorro || LINEAR || NYS || align=right | 1.1 km || 
|-id=720 bgcolor=#fefefe
| 179720 ||  || — || September 5, 2002 || Socorro || LINEAR || — || align=right | 1.4 km || 
|-id=721 bgcolor=#E9E9E9
| 179721 ||  || — || September 5, 2002 || Socorro || LINEAR || — || align=right | 1.8 km || 
|-id=722 bgcolor=#fefefe
| 179722 ||  || — || September 5, 2002 || Socorro || LINEAR || — || align=right | 2.0 km || 
|-id=723 bgcolor=#E9E9E9
| 179723 ||  || — || September 5, 2002 || Socorro || LINEAR || — || align=right | 4.5 km || 
|-id=724 bgcolor=#fefefe
| 179724 ||  || — || September 5, 2002 || Socorro || LINEAR || — || align=right data-sort-value="0.98" | 980 m || 
|-id=725 bgcolor=#E9E9E9
| 179725 ||  || — || September 5, 2002 || Socorro || LINEAR || JUN || align=right | 1.1 km || 
|-id=726 bgcolor=#fefefe
| 179726 ||  || — || September 5, 2002 || Socorro || LINEAR || NYS || align=right data-sort-value="0.97" | 970 m || 
|-id=727 bgcolor=#fefefe
| 179727 ||  || — || September 5, 2002 || Socorro || LINEAR || NYS || align=right | 1.2 km || 
|-id=728 bgcolor=#fefefe
| 179728 ||  || — || September 5, 2002 || Socorro || LINEAR || V || align=right | 1.2 km || 
|-id=729 bgcolor=#fefefe
| 179729 ||  || — || September 5, 2002 || Socorro || LINEAR || — || align=right | 1.4 km || 
|-id=730 bgcolor=#fefefe
| 179730 ||  || — || September 5, 2002 || Socorro || LINEAR || V || align=right | 1.2 km || 
|-id=731 bgcolor=#fefefe
| 179731 ||  || — || September 5, 2002 || Socorro || LINEAR || FLO || align=right | 1.3 km || 
|-id=732 bgcolor=#E9E9E9
| 179732 ||  || — || September 5, 2002 || Socorro || LINEAR || — || align=right | 7.6 km || 
|-id=733 bgcolor=#fefefe
| 179733 ||  || — || September 5, 2002 || Socorro || LINEAR || V || align=right data-sort-value="0.97" | 970 m || 
|-id=734 bgcolor=#fefefe
| 179734 ||  || — || September 5, 2002 || Socorro || LINEAR || — || align=right | 1.5 km || 
|-id=735 bgcolor=#fefefe
| 179735 ||  || — || September 5, 2002 || Haleakala || NEAT || FLO || align=right | 1.1 km || 
|-id=736 bgcolor=#fefefe
| 179736 ||  || — || September 6, 2002 || Socorro || LINEAR || — || align=right | 1.2 km || 
|-id=737 bgcolor=#fefefe
| 179737 ||  || — || September 6, 2002 || Socorro || LINEAR || V || align=right data-sort-value="0.95" | 950 m || 
|-id=738 bgcolor=#fefefe
| 179738 ||  || — || September 5, 2002 || Kvistaberg || UDAS || — || align=right | 1.8 km || 
|-id=739 bgcolor=#E9E9E9
| 179739 ||  || — || September 9, 2002 || Palomar || NEAT || GEF || align=right | 1.9 km || 
|-id=740 bgcolor=#fefefe
| 179740 ||  || — || September 11, 2002 || Haleakala || NEAT || FLO || align=right | 1.1 km || 
|-id=741 bgcolor=#fefefe
| 179741 ||  || — || September 10, 2002 || Haleakala || NEAT || V || align=right | 1.1 km || 
|-id=742 bgcolor=#fefefe
| 179742 ||  || — || September 11, 2002 || Palomar || NEAT || FLO || align=right | 1.1 km || 
|-id=743 bgcolor=#fefefe
| 179743 ||  || — || September 13, 2002 || Kitt Peak || Spacewatch || — || align=right | 1.2 km || 
|-id=744 bgcolor=#fefefe
| 179744 ||  || — || September 11, 2002 || Palomar || NEAT || V || align=right data-sort-value="0.87" | 870 m || 
|-id=745 bgcolor=#E9E9E9
| 179745 ||  || — || September 12, 2002 || Palomar || NEAT || — || align=right | 1.3 km || 
|-id=746 bgcolor=#fefefe
| 179746 ||  || — || September 12, 2002 || Palomar || NEAT || — || align=right | 1.5 km || 
|-id=747 bgcolor=#E9E9E9
| 179747 ||  || — || September 13, 2002 || Palomar || NEAT || NEM || align=right | 4.2 km || 
|-id=748 bgcolor=#fefefe
| 179748 ||  || — || September 13, 2002 || Palomar || NEAT || FLO || align=right | 1.00 km || 
|-id=749 bgcolor=#fefefe
| 179749 ||  || — || September 13, 2002 || Palomar || NEAT || — || align=right | 1.4 km || 
|-id=750 bgcolor=#fefefe
| 179750 ||  || — || September 13, 2002 || Socorro || LINEAR || — || align=right | 1.3 km || 
|-id=751 bgcolor=#E9E9E9
| 179751 ||  || — || September 14, 2002 || Palomar || NEAT || — || align=right | 1.1 km || 
|-id=752 bgcolor=#fefefe
| 179752 ||  || — || September 14, 2002 || Palomar || NEAT || V || align=right data-sort-value="0.85" | 850 m || 
|-id=753 bgcolor=#fefefe
| 179753 ||  || — || September 14, 2002 || Palomar || NEAT || — || align=right | 1.1 km || 
|-id=754 bgcolor=#fefefe
| 179754 ||  || — || September 14, 2002 || Palomar || NEAT || MAS || align=right | 1.1 km || 
|-id=755 bgcolor=#fefefe
| 179755 ||  || — || September 14, 2002 || Haleakala || NEAT || FLO || align=right | 1.3 km || 
|-id=756 bgcolor=#fefefe
| 179756 ||  || — || September 15, 2002 || Haleakala || NEAT || — || align=right | 1.8 km || 
|-id=757 bgcolor=#fefefe
| 179757 ||  || — || September 13, 2002 || Haleakala || NEAT || V || align=right | 1.1 km || 
|-id=758 bgcolor=#fefefe
| 179758 ||  || — || September 14, 2002 || Palomar || NEAT || — || align=right | 1.3 km || 
|-id=759 bgcolor=#fefefe
| 179759 ||  || — || September 15, 2002 || Haleakala || NEAT || — || align=right | 1.4 km || 
|-id=760 bgcolor=#E9E9E9
| 179760 ||  || — || September 15, 2002 || Palomar || NEAT || — || align=right | 1.2 km || 
|-id=761 bgcolor=#fefefe
| 179761 ||  || — || September 1, 2002 || Palomar || S. F. Hönig || MAS || align=right | 1.1 km || 
|-id=762 bgcolor=#E9E9E9
| 179762 ||  || — || September 14, 2002 || Palomar || R. Matson || JUN || align=right | 1.6 km || 
|-id=763 bgcolor=#E9E9E9
| 179763 ||  || — || September 13, 2002 || Palomar || NEAT || — || align=right | 1.3 km || 
|-id=764 bgcolor=#fefefe
| 179764 Myriamsarah || 2002 SC ||  || September 16, 2002 || Vicques || M. Ory || V || align=right | 1.1 km || 
|-id=765 bgcolor=#fefefe
| 179765 ||  || — || September 27, 2002 || Palomar || NEAT || — || align=right | 1.5 km || 
|-id=766 bgcolor=#fefefe
| 179766 ||  || — || September 27, 2002 || Palomar || NEAT || NYS || align=right data-sort-value="0.98" | 980 m || 
|-id=767 bgcolor=#E9E9E9
| 179767 ||  || — || September 27, 2002 || Palomar || NEAT || — || align=right | 1.3 km || 
|-id=768 bgcolor=#E9E9E9
| 179768 ||  || — || September 27, 2002 || Palomar || NEAT || — || align=right | 1.4 km || 
|-id=769 bgcolor=#E9E9E9
| 179769 ||  || — || September 26, 2002 || Palomar || NEAT || — || align=right | 1.2 km || 
|-id=770 bgcolor=#fefefe
| 179770 ||  || — || September 26, 2002 || Palomar || NEAT || — || align=right | 1.3 km || 
|-id=771 bgcolor=#fefefe
| 179771 ||  || — || September 28, 2002 || Haleakala || NEAT || — || align=right | 1.6 km || 
|-id=772 bgcolor=#fefefe
| 179772 ||  || — || September 28, 2002 || Haleakala || NEAT || V || align=right | 1.3 km || 
|-id=773 bgcolor=#fefefe
| 179773 ||  || — || September 29, 2002 || Haleakala || NEAT || NYS || align=right | 1.2 km || 
|-id=774 bgcolor=#fefefe
| 179774 ||  || — || September 30, 2002 || Haleakala || NEAT || — || align=right | 1.5 km || 
|-id=775 bgcolor=#FA8072
| 179775 ||  || — || September 29, 2002 || Haleakala || NEAT || — || align=right | 1.4 km || 
|-id=776 bgcolor=#fefefe
| 179776 ||  || — || September 29, 2002 || Haleakala || NEAT || V || align=right data-sort-value="0.90" | 900 m || 
|-id=777 bgcolor=#fefefe
| 179777 ||  || — || September 30, 2002 || Socorro || LINEAR || FLO || align=right | 1.1 km || 
|-id=778 bgcolor=#FA8072
| 179778 ||  || — || September 30, 2002 || Socorro || LINEAR || — || align=right | 1.6 km || 
|-id=779 bgcolor=#fefefe
| 179779 ||  || — || September 30, 2002 || Socorro || LINEAR || NYS || align=right data-sort-value="0.90" | 900 m || 
|-id=780 bgcolor=#fefefe
| 179780 ||  || — || September 16, 2002 || Palomar || NEAT || — || align=right | 1.5 km || 
|-id=781 bgcolor=#fefefe
| 179781 ||  || — || September 26, 2002 || Palomar || NEAT || V || align=right data-sort-value="0.87" | 870 m || 
|-id=782 bgcolor=#fefefe
| 179782 ||  || — || September 17, 2002 || Palomar || NEAT || V || align=right data-sort-value="0.84" | 840 m || 
|-id=783 bgcolor=#fefefe
| 179783 ||  || — || September 16, 2002 || Palomar || NEAT || — || align=right | 1.3 km || 
|-id=784 bgcolor=#E9E9E9
| 179784 ||  || — || September 16, 2002 || Palomar || NEAT || — || align=right | 1.3 km || 
|-id=785 bgcolor=#fefefe
| 179785 ||  || — || October 1, 2002 || Anderson Mesa || LONEOS || NYS || align=right data-sort-value="0.95" | 950 m || 
|-id=786 bgcolor=#fefefe
| 179786 ||  || — || October 1, 2002 || Anderson Mesa || LONEOS || MAS || align=right | 1.1 km || 
|-id=787 bgcolor=#fefefe
| 179787 ||  || — || October 1, 2002 || Socorro || LINEAR || V || align=right | 1.6 km || 
|-id=788 bgcolor=#fefefe
| 179788 ||  || — || October 1, 2002 || Haleakala || NEAT || NYS || align=right data-sort-value="0.87" | 870 m || 
|-id=789 bgcolor=#E9E9E9
| 179789 ||  || — || October 1, 2002 || Socorro || LINEAR || — || align=right | 1.6 km || 
|-id=790 bgcolor=#fefefe
| 179790 ||  || — || October 1, 2002 || Socorro || LINEAR || — || align=right | 1.3 km || 
|-id=791 bgcolor=#E9E9E9
| 179791 ||  || — || October 2, 2002 || Socorro || LINEAR || — || align=right | 1.2 km || 
|-id=792 bgcolor=#E9E9E9
| 179792 ||  || — || October 2, 2002 || Socorro || LINEAR || — || align=right | 1.2 km || 
|-id=793 bgcolor=#E9E9E9
| 179793 ||  || — || October 2, 2002 || Socorro || LINEAR || — || align=right | 1.0 km || 
|-id=794 bgcolor=#fefefe
| 179794 ||  || — || October 2, 2002 || Socorro || LINEAR || — || align=right | 1.0 km || 
|-id=795 bgcolor=#fefefe
| 179795 ||  || — || October 2, 2002 || Socorro || LINEAR || — || align=right | 1.3 km || 
|-id=796 bgcolor=#E9E9E9
| 179796 ||  || — || October 2, 2002 || Socorro || LINEAR || EUN || align=right | 1.9 km || 
|-id=797 bgcolor=#fefefe
| 179797 ||  || — || October 2, 2002 || Socorro || LINEAR || NYS || align=right | 1.0 km || 
|-id=798 bgcolor=#fefefe
| 179798 ||  || — || October 2, 2002 || Socorro || LINEAR || — || align=right | 1.5 km || 
|-id=799 bgcolor=#E9E9E9
| 179799 ||  || — || October 2, 2002 || Socorro || LINEAR || — || align=right | 1.5 km || 
|-id=800 bgcolor=#fefefe
| 179800 ||  || — || October 2, 2002 || Socorro || LINEAR || MAS || align=right | 1.1 km || 
|}

179801–179900 

|-bgcolor=#E9E9E9
| 179801 ||  || — || October 2, 2002 || Socorro || LINEAR || — || align=right | 1.9 km || 
|-id=802 bgcolor=#E9E9E9
| 179802 ||  || — || October 2, 2002 || Socorro || LINEAR || RAF || align=right | 1.5 km || 
|-id=803 bgcolor=#fefefe
| 179803 ||  || — || October 2, 2002 || Socorro || LINEAR || — || align=right | 1.3 km || 
|-id=804 bgcolor=#E9E9E9
| 179804 ||  || — || October 3, 2002 || Campo Imperatore || CINEOS || PAD || align=right | 2.6 km || 
|-id=805 bgcolor=#E9E9E9
| 179805 ||  || — || October 3, 2002 || Campo Imperatore || CINEOS || — || align=right | 3.7 km || 
|-id=806 bgcolor=#FFC2E0
| 179806 ||  || — || October 5, 2002 || Socorro || LINEAR || APOPHAcritical || align=right data-sort-value="0.32" | 320 m || 
|-id=807 bgcolor=#E9E9E9
| 179807 ||  || — || October 6, 2002 || Haleakala || NEAT || — || align=right | 2.0 km || 
|-id=808 bgcolor=#E9E9E9
| 179808 ||  || — || October 9, 2002 || Tenagra II || C. W. Juels, P. R. Holvorcem || EUN || align=right | 1.8 km || 
|-id=809 bgcolor=#fefefe
| 179809 ||  || — || October 3, 2002 || Palomar || NEAT || — || align=right | 1.8 km || 
|-id=810 bgcolor=#fefefe
| 179810 ||  || — || October 1, 2002 || Anderson Mesa || LONEOS || SUL || align=right | 2.7 km || 
|-id=811 bgcolor=#E9E9E9
| 179811 ||  || — || October 1, 2002 || Anderson Mesa || LONEOS || — || align=right | 1.7 km || 
|-id=812 bgcolor=#fefefe
| 179812 ||  || — || October 1, 2002 || Anderson Mesa || LONEOS || — || align=right | 1.3 km || 
|-id=813 bgcolor=#E9E9E9
| 179813 ||  || — || October 1, 2002 || Socorro || LINEAR || — || align=right | 1.6 km || 
|-id=814 bgcolor=#fefefe
| 179814 ||  || — || October 1, 2002 || Anderson Mesa || LONEOS || — || align=right | 1.1 km || 
|-id=815 bgcolor=#fefefe
| 179815 ||  || — || October 1, 2002 || Socorro || LINEAR || — || align=right | 2.1 km || 
|-id=816 bgcolor=#fefefe
| 179816 ||  || — || October 2, 2002 || Campo Imperatore || CINEOS || — || align=right | 1.5 km || 
|-id=817 bgcolor=#fefefe
| 179817 ||  || — || October 3, 2002 || Palomar || NEAT || V || align=right | 1.2 km || 
|-id=818 bgcolor=#fefefe
| 179818 ||  || — || October 3, 2002 || Socorro || LINEAR || — || align=right | 1.1 km || 
|-id=819 bgcolor=#E9E9E9
| 179819 ||  || — || October 3, 2002 || Socorro || LINEAR || — || align=right | 1.4 km || 
|-id=820 bgcolor=#fefefe
| 179820 ||  || — || October 4, 2002 || Socorro || LINEAR || NYS || align=right | 1.0 km || 
|-id=821 bgcolor=#fefefe
| 179821 ||  || — || October 4, 2002 || Socorro || LINEAR || — || align=right | 1.3 km || 
|-id=822 bgcolor=#E9E9E9
| 179822 ||  || — || October 3, 2002 || Palomar || NEAT || — || align=right | 3.1 km || 
|-id=823 bgcolor=#E9E9E9
| 179823 ||  || — || October 3, 2002 || Palomar || NEAT || — || align=right | 1.6 km || 
|-id=824 bgcolor=#fefefe
| 179824 ||  || — || October 4, 2002 || Socorro || LINEAR || FLO || align=right | 1.1 km || 
|-id=825 bgcolor=#fefefe
| 179825 ||  || — || October 4, 2002 || Socorro || LINEAR || V || align=right | 1.1 km || 
|-id=826 bgcolor=#fefefe
| 179826 ||  || — || October 4, 2002 || Socorro || LINEAR || — || align=right | 1.6 km || 
|-id=827 bgcolor=#fefefe
| 179827 ||  || — || October 4, 2002 || Socorro || LINEAR || — || align=right | 1.6 km || 
|-id=828 bgcolor=#fefefe
| 179828 ||  || — || October 4, 2002 || Anderson Mesa || LONEOS || — || align=right | 1.5 km || 
|-id=829 bgcolor=#E9E9E9
| 179829 ||  || — || October 5, 2002 || Palomar || NEAT || MAR || align=right | 1.2 km || 
|-id=830 bgcolor=#E9E9E9
| 179830 ||  || — || October 5, 2002 || Palomar || NEAT || — || align=right | 1.5 km || 
|-id=831 bgcolor=#E9E9E9
| 179831 ||  || — || October 2, 2002 || Haleakala || NEAT || BRU || align=right | 4.6 km || 
|-id=832 bgcolor=#E9E9E9
| 179832 ||  || — || October 13, 2002 || Palomar || NEAT || ADE || align=right | 2.1 km || 
|-id=833 bgcolor=#E9E9E9
| 179833 ||  || — || October 14, 2002 || Socorro || LINEAR || EUN || align=right | 2.2 km || 
|-id=834 bgcolor=#E9E9E9
| 179834 ||  || — || October 14, 2002 || Socorro || LINEAR || EUN || align=right | 2.6 km || 
|-id=835 bgcolor=#fefefe
| 179835 ||  || — || October 4, 2002 || Socorro || LINEAR || — || align=right | 2.0 km || 
|-id=836 bgcolor=#E9E9E9
| 179836 ||  || — || October 5, 2002 || Socorro || LINEAR || — || align=right | 1.7 km || 
|-id=837 bgcolor=#fefefe
| 179837 ||  || — || October 4, 2002 || Socorro || LINEAR || — || align=right | 1.2 km || 
|-id=838 bgcolor=#fefefe
| 179838 ||  || — || October 5, 2002 || Socorro || LINEAR || — || align=right | 1.3 km || 
|-id=839 bgcolor=#E9E9E9
| 179839 ||  || — || October 6, 2002 || Socorro || LINEAR || — || align=right | 3.6 km || 
|-id=840 bgcolor=#E9E9E9
| 179840 ||  || — || October 7, 2002 || Socorro || LINEAR || — || align=right | 1.4 km || 
|-id=841 bgcolor=#fefefe
| 179841 ||  || — || October 8, 2002 || Anderson Mesa || LONEOS || FLO || align=right | 1.5 km || 
|-id=842 bgcolor=#E9E9E9
| 179842 ||  || — || October 8, 2002 || Anderson Mesa || LONEOS || — || align=right | 1.4 km || 
|-id=843 bgcolor=#E9E9E9
| 179843 ||  || — || October 8, 2002 || Anderson Mesa || LONEOS || — || align=right | 1.6 km || 
|-id=844 bgcolor=#fefefe
| 179844 ||  || — || October 7, 2002 || Haleakala || NEAT || — || align=right | 1.2 km || 
|-id=845 bgcolor=#fefefe
| 179845 ||  || — || October 7, 2002 || Socorro || LINEAR || V || align=right | 1.4 km || 
|-id=846 bgcolor=#fefefe
| 179846 ||  || — || October 9, 2002 || Anderson Mesa || LONEOS || — || align=right | 1.3 km || 
|-id=847 bgcolor=#E9E9E9
| 179847 ||  || — || October 9, 2002 || Kitt Peak || Spacewatch || — || align=right | 1.2 km || 
|-id=848 bgcolor=#fefefe
| 179848 ||  || — || October 7, 2002 || Socorro || LINEAR || — || align=right | 1.0 km || 
|-id=849 bgcolor=#fefefe
| 179849 ||  || — || October 7, 2002 || Haleakala || NEAT || — || align=right | 1.4 km || 
|-id=850 bgcolor=#fefefe
| 179850 ||  || — || October 8, 2002 || Anderson Mesa || LONEOS || V || align=right | 1.2 km || 
|-id=851 bgcolor=#fefefe
| 179851 ||  || — || October 8, 2002 || Anderson Mesa || LONEOS || NYS || align=right | 1.4 km || 
|-id=852 bgcolor=#E9E9E9
| 179852 ||  || — || October 9, 2002 || Anderson Mesa || LONEOS || — || align=right | 2.8 km || 
|-id=853 bgcolor=#fefefe
| 179853 ||  || — || October 9, 2002 || Socorro || LINEAR || — || align=right | 1.3 km || 
|-id=854 bgcolor=#E9E9E9
| 179854 ||  || — || October 9, 2002 || Socorro || LINEAR || — || align=right | 2.0 km || 
|-id=855 bgcolor=#E9E9E9
| 179855 ||  || — || October 9, 2002 || Socorro || LINEAR || — || align=right | 2.3 km || 
|-id=856 bgcolor=#E9E9E9
| 179856 ||  || — || October 10, 2002 || Socorro || LINEAR || — || align=right | 2.9 km || 
|-id=857 bgcolor=#E9E9E9
| 179857 ||  || — || October 10, 2002 || Socorro || LINEAR || — || align=right | 2.2 km || 
|-id=858 bgcolor=#E9E9E9
| 179858 ||  || — || October 10, 2002 || Socorro || LINEAR || — || align=right | 2.9 km || 
|-id=859 bgcolor=#E9E9E9
| 179859 ||  || — || October 8, 2002 || Anderson Mesa || LONEOS || — || align=right | 1.6 km || 
|-id=860 bgcolor=#fefefe
| 179860 ||  || — || October 9, 2002 || Socorro || LINEAR || — || align=right | 1.5 km || 
|-id=861 bgcolor=#E9E9E9
| 179861 ||  || — || October 9, 2002 || Socorro || LINEAR || RAF || align=right | 1.1 km || 
|-id=862 bgcolor=#fefefe
| 179862 ||  || — || October 9, 2002 || Socorro || LINEAR || — || align=right | 1.4 km || 
|-id=863 bgcolor=#fefefe
| 179863 ||  || — || October 9, 2002 || Socorro || LINEAR || FLO || align=right | 1.5 km || 
|-id=864 bgcolor=#E9E9E9
| 179864 ||  || — || October 9, 2002 || Socorro || LINEAR || — || align=right | 1.8 km || 
|-id=865 bgcolor=#E9E9E9
| 179865 ||  || — || October 9, 2002 || Socorro || LINEAR || — || align=right | 1.4 km || 
|-id=866 bgcolor=#E9E9E9
| 179866 ||  || — || October 10, 2002 || Socorro || LINEAR || — || align=right | 4.1 km || 
|-id=867 bgcolor=#E9E9E9
| 179867 ||  || — || October 10, 2002 || Socorro || LINEAR || — || align=right | 1.4 km || 
|-id=868 bgcolor=#fefefe
| 179868 ||  || — || October 10, 2002 || Socorro || LINEAR || V || align=right | 1.3 km || 
|-id=869 bgcolor=#fefefe
| 179869 ||  || — || October 10, 2002 || Socorro || LINEAR || V || align=right | 1.1 km || 
|-id=870 bgcolor=#fefefe
| 179870 ||  || — || October 10, 2002 || Socorro || LINEAR || — || align=right | 2.3 km || 
|-id=871 bgcolor=#E9E9E9
| 179871 ||  || — || October 10, 2002 || Socorro || LINEAR || JUN || align=right | 2.3 km || 
|-id=872 bgcolor=#E9E9E9
| 179872 ||  || — || October 12, 2002 || Socorro || LINEAR || — || align=right | 1.5 km || 
|-id=873 bgcolor=#E9E9E9
| 179873 ||  || — || October 11, 2002 || Socorro || LINEAR || — || align=right | 1.6 km || 
|-id=874 bgcolor=#E9E9E9
| 179874 Bojanvršnak ||  ||  || October 4, 2002 || Apache Point || SDSS || ADE || align=right | 2.1 km || 
|-id=875 bgcolor=#fefefe
| 179875 Budavari ||  ||  || October 5, 2002 || Apache Point || SDSS || V || align=right data-sort-value="0.83" | 830 m || 
|-id=876 bgcolor=#fefefe
| 179876 Goranpichler ||  ||  || October 5, 2002 || Apache Point || SDSS || — || align=right data-sort-value="0.72" | 720 m || 
|-id=877 bgcolor=#E9E9E9
| 179877 Pavlovski ||  ||  || October 5, 2002 || Apache Point || SDSS || — || align=right | 1.1 km || 
|-id=878 bgcolor=#E9E9E9
| 179878 ||  || — || October 4, 2002 || Anderson Mesa || LONEOS || — || align=right | 2.0 km || 
|-id=879 bgcolor=#FA8072
| 179879 || 2002 UB || — || October 16, 2002 || Palomar || NEAT || — || align=right data-sort-value="0.94" | 940 m || 
|-id=880 bgcolor=#E9E9E9
| 179880 || 2002 UE || — || October 18, 2002 || Palomar || NEAT || — || align=right | 1.3 km || 
|-id=881 bgcolor=#E9E9E9
| 179881 ||  || — || October 28, 2002 || Palomar || NEAT || — || align=right | 1.8 km || 
|-id=882 bgcolor=#E9E9E9
| 179882 ||  || — || October 30, 2002 || Socorro || LINEAR || EUN || align=right | 1.6 km || 
|-id=883 bgcolor=#E9E9E9
| 179883 ||  || — || October 30, 2002 || Palomar || NEAT || KON || align=right | 3.6 km || 
|-id=884 bgcolor=#E9E9E9
| 179884 ||  || — || October 30, 2002 || Palomar || NEAT || — || align=right | 1.8 km || 
|-id=885 bgcolor=#E9E9E9
| 179885 ||  || — || October 30, 2002 || Haleakala || NEAT || — || align=right | 2.0 km || 
|-id=886 bgcolor=#fefefe
| 179886 ||  || — || October 28, 2002 || Haleakala || NEAT || NYS || align=right | 1.2 km || 
|-id=887 bgcolor=#E9E9E9
| 179887 ||  || — || October 30, 2002 || Palomar || NEAT || — || align=right | 2.1 km || 
|-id=888 bgcolor=#E9E9E9
| 179888 ||  || — || October 31, 2002 || Socorro || LINEAR || — || align=right | 1.8 km || 
|-id=889 bgcolor=#fefefe
| 179889 ||  || — || October 31, 2002 || Palomar || NEAT || — || align=right | 1.7 km || 
|-id=890 bgcolor=#E9E9E9
| 179890 ||  || — || October 30, 2002 || Palomar || NEAT || — || align=right | 4.8 km || 
|-id=891 bgcolor=#E9E9E9
| 179891 ||  || — || October 30, 2002 || Palomar || NEAT || — || align=right | 1.7 km || 
|-id=892 bgcolor=#fefefe
| 179892 ||  || — || October 31, 2002 || Socorro || LINEAR || V || align=right | 1.0 km || 
|-id=893 bgcolor=#E9E9E9
| 179893 ||  || — || October 31, 2002 || Anderson Mesa || LONEOS || — || align=right | 1.3 km || 
|-id=894 bgcolor=#fefefe
| 179894 ||  || — || October 31, 2002 || Palomar || NEAT || — || align=right | 1.3 km || 
|-id=895 bgcolor=#E9E9E9
| 179895 ||  || — || October 31, 2002 || Palomar || NEAT || — || align=right | 2.1 km || 
|-id=896 bgcolor=#E9E9E9
| 179896 ||  || — || October 31, 2002 || Palomar || NEAT || — || align=right | 2.1 km || 
|-id=897 bgcolor=#fefefe
| 179897 ||  || — || October 31, 2002 || La Palma || La Palma Obs. || NYS || align=right | 1.4 km || 
|-id=898 bgcolor=#E9E9E9
| 179898 ||  || — || October 31, 2002 || Socorro || LINEAR || — || align=right | 2.3 km || 
|-id=899 bgcolor=#E9E9E9
| 179899 ||  || — || October 31, 2002 || Socorro || LINEAR || — || align=right | 2.9 km || 
|-id=900 bgcolor=#E9E9E9
| 179900 ||  || — || October 31, 2002 || Socorro || LINEAR || — || align=right | 2.0 km || 
|}

179901–180000 

|-bgcolor=#E9E9E9
| 179901 Romanbrajša ||  ||  || October 30, 2002 || Apache Point || SDSS || — || align=right data-sort-value="0.93" | 930 m || 
|-id=902 bgcolor=#C2FFFF
| 179902 ||  || — || November 4, 2002 || Palomar || NEAT || L5 || align=right | 12 km || 
|-id=903 bgcolor=#E9E9E9
| 179903 ||  || — || November 4, 2002 || Haleakala || NEAT || — || align=right | 1.9 km || 
|-id=904 bgcolor=#E9E9E9
| 179904 ||  || — || November 1, 2002 || Palomar || NEAT || — || align=right | 1.3 km || 
|-id=905 bgcolor=#E9E9E9
| 179905 ||  || — || November 4, 2002 || Palomar || NEAT || — || align=right | 3.4 km || 
|-id=906 bgcolor=#E9E9E9
| 179906 ||  || — || November 5, 2002 || Socorro || LINEAR || — || align=right | 3.0 km || 
|-id=907 bgcolor=#fefefe
| 179907 ||  || — || November 5, 2002 || Kvistaberg || UDAS || — || align=right | 1.2 km || 
|-id=908 bgcolor=#E9E9E9
| 179908 ||  || — || November 5, 2002 || Socorro || LINEAR || — || align=right | 2.0 km || 
|-id=909 bgcolor=#E9E9E9
| 179909 ||  || — || November 5, 2002 || Socorro || LINEAR || — || align=right | 2.7 km || 
|-id=910 bgcolor=#fefefe
| 179910 ||  || — || November 5, 2002 || Socorro || LINEAR || — || align=right | 1.7 km || 
|-id=911 bgcolor=#E9E9E9
| 179911 ||  || — || November 5, 2002 || Anderson Mesa || LONEOS || — || align=right | 2.6 km || 
|-id=912 bgcolor=#E9E9E9
| 179912 ||  || — || November 5, 2002 || Anderson Mesa || LONEOS || — || align=right | 1.5 km || 
|-id=913 bgcolor=#E9E9E9
| 179913 ||  || — || November 5, 2002 || Socorro || LINEAR || — || align=right | 2.2 km || 
|-id=914 bgcolor=#E9E9E9
| 179914 ||  || — || November 5, 2002 || Socorro || LINEAR || — || align=right | 1.5 km || 
|-id=915 bgcolor=#E9E9E9
| 179915 ||  || — || November 5, 2002 || Socorro || LINEAR || — || align=right | 3.5 km || 
|-id=916 bgcolor=#E9E9E9
| 179916 ||  || — || November 5, 2002 || Socorro || LINEAR || — || align=right | 3.0 km || 
|-id=917 bgcolor=#E9E9E9
| 179917 ||  || — || November 4, 2002 || Palomar || NEAT || — || align=right | 1.8 km || 
|-id=918 bgcolor=#E9E9E9
| 179918 ||  || — || November 5, 2002 || Socorro || LINEAR || ADE || align=right | 5.1 km || 
|-id=919 bgcolor=#E9E9E9
| 179919 ||  || — || November 5, 2002 || Socorro || LINEAR || JUN || align=right | 2.0 km || 
|-id=920 bgcolor=#E9E9E9
| 179920 ||  || — || November 5, 2002 || Socorro || LINEAR || — || align=right | 1.5 km || 
|-id=921 bgcolor=#E9E9E9
| 179921 ||  || — || November 5, 2002 || Anderson Mesa || LONEOS || — || align=right | 2.0 km || 
|-id=922 bgcolor=#E9E9E9
| 179922 ||  || — || November 6, 2002 || Anderson Mesa || LONEOS || — || align=right | 2.6 km || 
|-id=923 bgcolor=#E9E9E9
| 179923 ||  || — || November 6, 2002 || Haleakala || NEAT || — || align=right | 2.0 km || 
|-id=924 bgcolor=#E9E9E9
| 179924 ||  || — || November 3, 2002 || Haleakala || NEAT || EUNfast? || align=right | 1.9 km || 
|-id=925 bgcolor=#E9E9E9
| 179925 ||  || — || November 3, 2002 || Haleakala || NEAT || — || align=right | 1.8 km || 
|-id=926 bgcolor=#E9E9E9
| 179926 ||  || — || November 7, 2002 || Anderson Mesa || LONEOS || EUN || align=right | 2.0 km || 
|-id=927 bgcolor=#E9E9E9
| 179927 ||  || — || November 8, 2002 || Socorro || LINEAR || ADE || align=right | 4.7 km || 
|-id=928 bgcolor=#E9E9E9
| 179928 ||  || — || November 8, 2002 || Socorro || LINEAR || — || align=right | 1.7 km || 
|-id=929 bgcolor=#E9E9E9
| 179929 ||  || — || November 7, 2002 || Socorro || LINEAR || KON || align=right | 2.7 km || 
|-id=930 bgcolor=#E9E9E9
| 179930 ||  || — || November 7, 2002 || Socorro || LINEAR || — || align=right | 2.4 km || 
|-id=931 bgcolor=#E9E9E9
| 179931 ||  || — || November 7, 2002 || Socorro || LINEAR || — || align=right | 2.8 km || 
|-id=932 bgcolor=#E9E9E9
| 179932 ||  || — || November 7, 2002 || Socorro || LINEAR || — || align=right | 1.6 km || 
|-id=933 bgcolor=#E9E9E9
| 179933 ||  || — || November 7, 2002 || Socorro || LINEAR || — || align=right | 2.6 km || 
|-id=934 bgcolor=#E9E9E9
| 179934 ||  || — || November 7, 2002 || Socorro || LINEAR || — || align=right | 2.8 km || 
|-id=935 bgcolor=#E9E9E9
| 179935 ||  || — || November 7, 2002 || Socorro || LINEAR || — || align=right | 2.6 km || 
|-id=936 bgcolor=#E9E9E9
| 179936 ||  || — || November 7, 2002 || Socorro || LINEAR || — || align=right | 2.3 km || 
|-id=937 bgcolor=#fefefe
| 179937 ||  || — || November 11, 2002 || Anderson Mesa || LONEOS || SUL || align=right | 3.0 km || 
|-id=938 bgcolor=#E9E9E9
| 179938 ||  || — || November 11, 2002 || Socorro || LINEAR || KRM || align=right | 2.8 km || 
|-id=939 bgcolor=#E9E9E9
| 179939 ||  || — || November 11, 2002 || Socorro || LINEAR || — || align=right | 1.4 km || 
|-id=940 bgcolor=#E9E9E9
| 179940 ||  || — || November 11, 2002 || Anderson Mesa || LONEOS || — || align=right | 2.1 km || 
|-id=941 bgcolor=#fefefe
| 179941 ||  || — || November 11, 2002 || Anderson Mesa || LONEOS || — || align=right | 1.5 km || 
|-id=942 bgcolor=#E9E9E9
| 179942 ||  || — || November 12, 2002 || Socorro || LINEAR || — || align=right | 2.3 km || 
|-id=943 bgcolor=#E9E9E9
| 179943 ||  || — || November 12, 2002 || Socorro || LINEAR || — || align=right | 2.2 km || 
|-id=944 bgcolor=#E9E9E9
| 179944 ||  || — || November 12, 2002 || Socorro || LINEAR || EUN || align=right | 2.7 km || 
|-id=945 bgcolor=#E9E9E9
| 179945 ||  || — || November 12, 2002 || Socorro || LINEAR || — || align=right | 2.3 km || 
|-id=946 bgcolor=#E9E9E9
| 179946 ||  || — || November 13, 2002 || Palomar || NEAT || — || align=right | 3.3 km || 
|-id=947 bgcolor=#E9E9E9
| 179947 ||  || — || November 13, 2002 || Palomar || NEAT || — || align=right | 3.1 km || 
|-id=948 bgcolor=#E9E9E9
| 179948 ||  || — || November 14, 2002 || Socorro || LINEAR || — || align=right | 1.7 km || 
|-id=949 bgcolor=#E9E9E9
| 179949 ||  || — || November 23, 2002 || Palomar || NEAT || — || align=right | 1.5 km || 
|-id=950 bgcolor=#E9E9E9
| 179950 ||  || — || November 23, 2002 || Palomar || NEAT || — || align=right | 3.2 km || 
|-id=951 bgcolor=#E9E9E9
| 179951 ||  || — || November 24, 2002 || Palomar || NEAT || — || align=right | 2.1 km || 
|-id=952 bgcolor=#E9E9E9
| 179952 ||  || — || November 24, 2002 || Palomar || NEAT || — || align=right | 1.7 km || 
|-id=953 bgcolor=#E9E9E9
| 179953 ||  || — || November 24, 2002 || Palomar || NEAT || — || align=right | 1.5 km || 
|-id=954 bgcolor=#E9E9E9
| 179954 ||  || — || November 24, 2002 || Palomar || NEAT || — || align=right | 4.1 km || 
|-id=955 bgcolor=#E9E9E9
| 179955 ||  || — || November 28, 2002 || Haleakala || NEAT || 526 || align=right | 3.7 km || 
|-id=956 bgcolor=#E9E9E9
| 179956 ||  || — || November 30, 2002 || Socorro || LINEAR || — || align=right | 5.0 km || 
|-id=957 bgcolor=#E9E9E9
| 179957 ||  || — || November 25, 2002 || Palomar || S. F. Hönig || — || align=right | 1.4 km || 
|-id=958 bgcolor=#E9E9E9
| 179958 ||  || — || November 23, 2002 || Palomar || S. F. Hönig || — || align=right | 1.5 km || 
|-id=959 bgcolor=#E9E9E9
| 179959 || 2002 XO || — || December 1, 2002 || Socorro || LINEAR || — || align=right | 2.2 km || 
|-id=960 bgcolor=#E9E9E9
| 179960 ||  || — || December 1, 2002 || Socorro || LINEAR || — || align=right | 2.6 km || 
|-id=961 bgcolor=#E9E9E9
| 179961 ||  || — || December 2, 2002 || Socorro || LINEAR || — || align=right | 1.8 km || 
|-id=962 bgcolor=#E9E9E9
| 179962 ||  || — || December 2, 2002 || Socorro || LINEAR || — || align=right | 1.7 km || 
|-id=963 bgcolor=#E9E9E9
| 179963 ||  || — || December 2, 2002 || Socorro || LINEAR || — || align=right | 2.1 km || 
|-id=964 bgcolor=#E9E9E9
| 179964 ||  || — || December 2, 2002 || Socorro || LINEAR || — || align=right | 1.5 km || 
|-id=965 bgcolor=#E9E9E9
| 179965 ||  || — || December 3, 2002 || Palomar || NEAT || — || align=right | 1.9 km || 
|-id=966 bgcolor=#E9E9E9
| 179966 ||  || — || December 2, 2002 || Socorro || LINEAR || — || align=right | 2.2 km || 
|-id=967 bgcolor=#E9E9E9
| 179967 ||  || — || December 5, 2002 || Socorro || LINEAR || — || align=right | 2.3 km || 
|-id=968 bgcolor=#E9E9E9
| 179968 ||  || — || December 5, 2002 || Socorro || LINEAR || — || align=right | 3.1 km || 
|-id=969 bgcolor=#E9E9E9
| 179969 ||  || — || December 7, 2002 || Palomar || NEAT || — || align=right | 4.0 km || 
|-id=970 bgcolor=#E9E9E9
| 179970 ||  || — || December 5, 2002 || Socorro || LINEAR || — || align=right | 1.7 km || 
|-id=971 bgcolor=#E9E9E9
| 179971 ||  || — || December 6, 2002 || Socorro || LINEAR || — || align=right | 2.2 km || 
|-id=972 bgcolor=#fefefe
| 179972 ||  || — || December 6, 2002 || Socorro || LINEAR || — || align=right | 1.7 km || 
|-id=973 bgcolor=#E9E9E9
| 179973 ||  || — || December 6, 2002 || Socorro || LINEAR || — || align=right | 2.7 km || 
|-id=974 bgcolor=#E9E9E9
| 179974 ||  || — || December 7, 2002 || Socorro || LINEAR || EUN || align=right | 2.3 km || 
|-id=975 bgcolor=#E9E9E9
| 179975 ||  || — || December 6, 2002 || Socorro || LINEAR || — || align=right | 2.3 km || 
|-id=976 bgcolor=#E9E9E9
| 179976 ||  || — || December 8, 2002 || Kitt Peak || Spacewatch || — || align=right | 2.8 km || 
|-id=977 bgcolor=#E9E9E9
| 179977 ||  || — || December 9, 2002 || Kitt Peak || Spacewatch || — || align=right | 2.3 km || 
|-id=978 bgcolor=#E9E9E9
| 179978 ||  || — || December 7, 2002 || Socorro || LINEAR || — || align=right | 3.5 km || 
|-id=979 bgcolor=#fefefe
| 179979 ||  || — || December 10, 2002 || Socorro || LINEAR || — || align=right | 1.7 km || 
|-id=980 bgcolor=#E9E9E9
| 179980 ||  || — || December 10, 2002 || Socorro || LINEAR || — || align=right | 2.7 km || 
|-id=981 bgcolor=#E9E9E9
| 179981 ||  || — || December 10, 2002 || Socorro || LINEAR || — || align=right | 2.4 km || 
|-id=982 bgcolor=#E9E9E9
| 179982 ||  || — || December 10, 2002 || Socorro || LINEAR || — || align=right | 2.1 km || 
|-id=983 bgcolor=#E9E9E9
| 179983 ||  || — || December 10, 2002 || Socorro || LINEAR || — || align=right | 1.7 km || 
|-id=984 bgcolor=#E9E9E9
| 179984 ||  || — || December 10, 2002 || Palomar || NEAT || — || align=right | 1.5 km || 
|-id=985 bgcolor=#E9E9E9
| 179985 ||  || — || December 10, 2002 || Palomar || NEAT || — || align=right | 2.2 km || 
|-id=986 bgcolor=#E9E9E9
| 179986 ||  || — || December 11, 2002 || Socorro || LINEAR || — || align=right | 1.9 km || 
|-id=987 bgcolor=#E9E9E9
| 179987 ||  || — || December 11, 2002 || Socorro || LINEAR || — || align=right | 2.9 km || 
|-id=988 bgcolor=#E9E9E9
| 179988 ||  || — || December 10, 2002 || Socorro || LINEAR || — || align=right | 1.9 km || 
|-id=989 bgcolor=#E9E9E9
| 179989 ||  || — || December 11, 2002 || Socorro || LINEAR || JUN || align=right | 2.5 km || 
|-id=990 bgcolor=#E9E9E9
| 179990 ||  || — || December 11, 2002 || Socorro || LINEAR || — || align=right | 3.7 km || 
|-id=991 bgcolor=#E9E9E9
| 179991 ||  || — || December 11, 2002 || Socorro || LINEAR || DOR || align=right | 3.8 km || 
|-id=992 bgcolor=#E9E9E9
| 179992 ||  || — || December 11, 2002 || Socorro || LINEAR || — || align=right | 2.8 km || 
|-id=993 bgcolor=#E9E9E9
| 179993 ||  || — || December 11, 2002 || Socorro || LINEAR || — || align=right | 3.2 km || 
|-id=994 bgcolor=#E9E9E9
| 179994 ||  || — || December 11, 2002 || Socorro || LINEAR || — || align=right | 4.0 km || 
|-id=995 bgcolor=#E9E9E9
| 179995 ||  || — || December 5, 2002 || Socorro || LINEAR || — || align=right | 2.1 km || 
|-id=996 bgcolor=#E9E9E9
| 179996 ||  || — || December 5, 2002 || Socorro || LINEAR || — || align=right | 2.6 km || 
|-id=997 bgcolor=#E9E9E9
| 179997 ||  || — || December 6, 2002 || Socorro || LINEAR || — || align=right | 1.9 km || 
|-id=998 bgcolor=#fefefe
| 179998 ||  || — || December 2, 2002 || Socorro || LINEAR || — || align=right | 1.6 km || 
|-id=999 bgcolor=#E9E9E9
| 179999 || 2002 YL || — || December 27, 2002 || Anderson Mesa || LONEOS || — || align=right | 4.0 km || 
|-id=000 bgcolor=#E9E9E9
| 180000 || 2002 YT || — || December 27, 2002 || Anderson Mesa || LONEOS || — || align=right | 3.7 km || 
|}

References

External links 
 Discovery Circumstances: Numbered Minor Planets (175001)–(180000) (IAU Minor Planet Center)

0179